= Bluewater =

Bluewater(s) or Blue Water(s) may refer to:

== Maritime ==
- Blue water, the global deep oceans
- Blue Water 24, an American sailboat design
- Blue-water navy, a navy that can operate in deep waters of open oceans
- MV Bluewater, a Panamanian tanker in service 1952-59

== Places and structures ==
=== Australia ===
- Bluewater, Queensland, a suburb of Townsville
  - Bluewater Beach, Queensland, a town within Bluewater

=== Barbados ===
- Blue Waters, Christ Church, Barbados, a populated place in the parish of Christ Church, Barbados

=== Canada ===
- Bluewater, Ontario, a town near Sarnia
- Bluewater Route (Ontario Highway 21), a tourist trail along the eastern shore of Lake Huron in Ontario
- Blue Water Bridge, linking Canada and the United States

=== South Africa ===
- Bluewater Bay, Eastern Cape, a seaside suburb of Port Elizabeth

=== United Kingdom ===
- Bluewater Shopping Centre, a large shopping centre in Kent, England

=== United States ===
- Bluewater, Arizona, census-designated place
- Bluewater, California, census-designated place
- Bluewater, Lincoln County, New Mexico, unincorporated community
- Bluewater, McKinley County, New Mexico, census-designated place
- Bluewater Acres, New Mexico, former name for Las Tusas census-designated place
- Bluewater Lake State Park, New Mexico
- Bluewater Village, New Mexico, census-designated place in Cibola County, location of Bluewater post office
- Bluewater Branch, a river in Tennessee
- Bluewater Creek, a stream in Missouri

=== United Arab Emirates ===
- Bluewaters Island, Dubai, UAE

== Entertainment ==
- Blue Water (film)
- Bluewater Productions, comic book publisher
- Blue Water Studios, an animation recording company

== Other uses ==
- Blue Water (missile), British short range nuclear missile of the 1960s
- Blue Water (train), an Amtrak line from eastern Michigan to Chicago
- Blue Waters F.C., a Namibian football club

== See also ==
- Blue Water High, Australian television drama series
- Nadia: The Secret of Blue Water, a Japanese animated series
  - Nadia: The Secret of Blue Water (video game), based on the animated series
- Battle of Blue Waters
