= Acheron Island =

Island of Queensland, Australia

Acheron
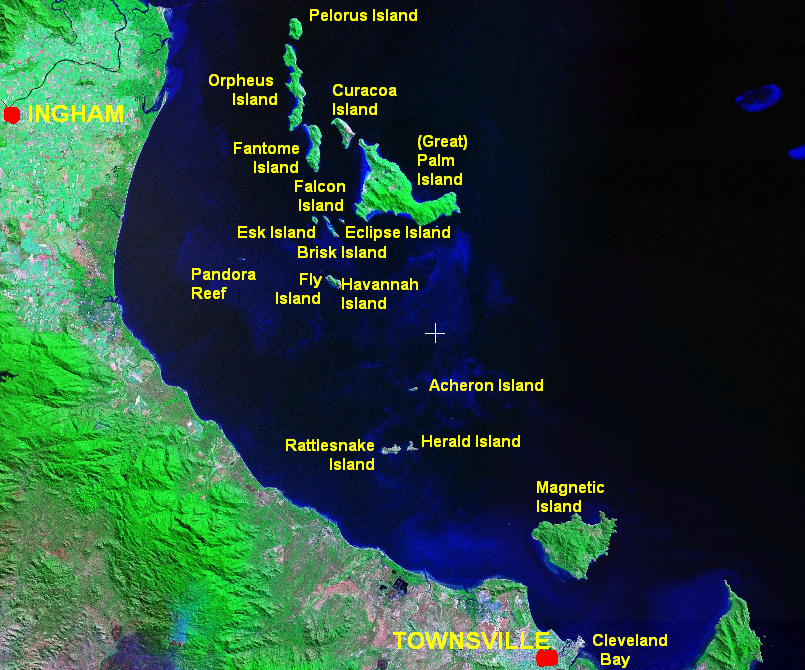
- Acheron Island and surrounds

Geography
- Location: Border of Halifax Bay and Coral Sea
- Coordinates: 18°57′47″S 146°38′17″E

Administration
- Australia

Demographics
- Population: 0

Acheron Island is one of the islands south of the Great Palm Island group. The island is halfway between Magnetic Island and Great Palm Island.

The island lies near the border of Halifax Bay and Coral Sea, east of Rollingstone and north of Townsville about 40 km (25 mi).

The island is just north of Rattlesnake Island, where the RAAF practices bombing raids. Possibly (covered up by SQN 3 Co WC Brown, at the time) the site of an accidental practice bombing with a Mk84 500 lb bomb by a RAAF FA-18 flown by a RAF exchange pilot in 1997. Four campers were on the island and a large fire was started. Other nearby islands are Herald Island, Bramble Island and Cordelia Rocks.

== Climate ==
Acheron Island

Climate chart (precipitation, max. and min. temperature)
J	F	M	A	M	J	J	A	S	O	N	D
168 26 24	263 26 24	273 28 24	104 26 22	59 25 21	33 21 19	52 22 19	14 24 19	4 26 21	8 27 21	34 28 23	63 27 24
- █ Average max. and min. temperatures in °C
- █ Precipitation totals in mm
Imperial conversion
J	F	M	A	M	J	J	A	S	O	N	D
6.6 79 75	10 79 75	11 82 75	4.1 79 72	2.3 77 70	1.3 70 66	2 72 66	0.6 75 66	0.2 79 70	0.3 81 70	1.3 82 73	2.5 81 75
- █ Average max. and min. temperatures in °F
- █ Precipitation totals in inches

== See also ==
- List of islands of Australia
