= Herald Island (Queensland) =

Island in Queensland, Australia

Coordinates: 19°01′48″S 146°38′06″E

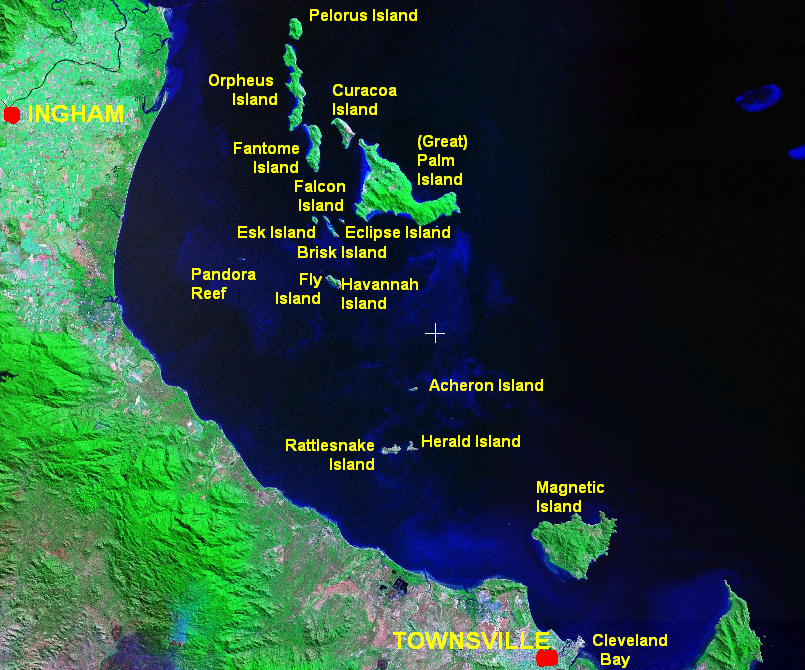
Herald Island and surrounds

Herald Island is in Halifax Bay, south of the Great Palm Island group, northwest of Magnetic Island and northeast of Rollingstone, Queensland, in Australia. The nearest island is Rattlesnake Island (RAAF bombing site). Other nearby islands are Cordelia Rocks, Bramble Island, and Acheron Island.

Both Herald Island and Rattlesnake Island are designated live firing ranges and have been used by both the Air Force and Army for live firing practices since 1942. This means that there is a possibility of unexploded ordnance on both of these islands. There are warning signs placed at all beaches.

There is no fresh water storage on this island, however, at the southern end of the beach is a dry creek bed that may contain water if you dig for it. The vegetation is sparse and consists of mainly Mitchell grass and she-oaks. The island is used for survival training both by the air force and army. Details of closures of the islands is announced in the Townsville Bulletin newspaper and it details dates and times the island will be closed to the public.

There are no facilities of any type currently on Herald Island. The channel between Herald and Rattlesnake Islands is only suitable as an anchorage in mild conditions. There are no sheltered bays on Herald Island. The only useful landing point is on the northwestern end of the island.
