= Halifax Bay Wetlands National Park =

National park in Queensland, Australia

- IUCN category II (national park)
- Location within Queensland
- Location: Queensland
- Coordinates: 18°52′03″S 146°16′08″E
- Area: 4.47 km^{2} (1.73 sq mi)
- Established: 1994
- Governing body: Queensland Parks and Wildlife Service
- Website: Official website

Halifax Bay Wetlands is a national park at Halifax Bay in Queensland, Australia, 1179 km northwest of Brisbane.

The one island in the park is Pandora Reef. This place is known as a spawning ground for many species of fish, such as barramundi, mangrove jack, grunter and salmon.

== See also ==
- Protected areas of Queensland
