= Greenvale railway line =

Greenvale railway line was in northern Queensland, Australia. It carried nickel ore from a mine in Greenvale to the Queensland Nickel's refinery in Yabulu, approximately 20 kilometres (12 mi) north of Townsville.

== History ==
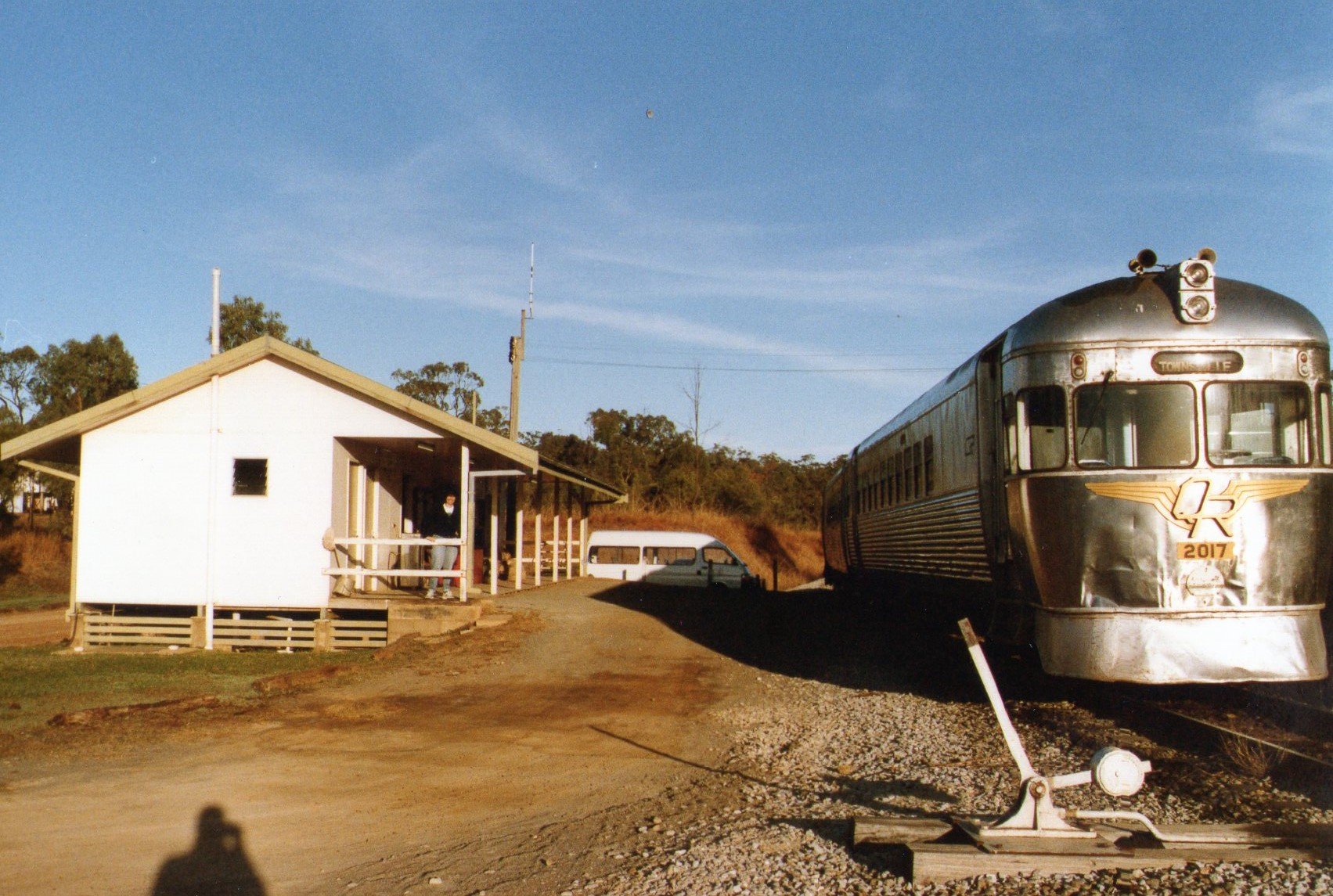
RM 2017 at Greenvale station about to depart on the fortnightly service to Townsville, ~1991

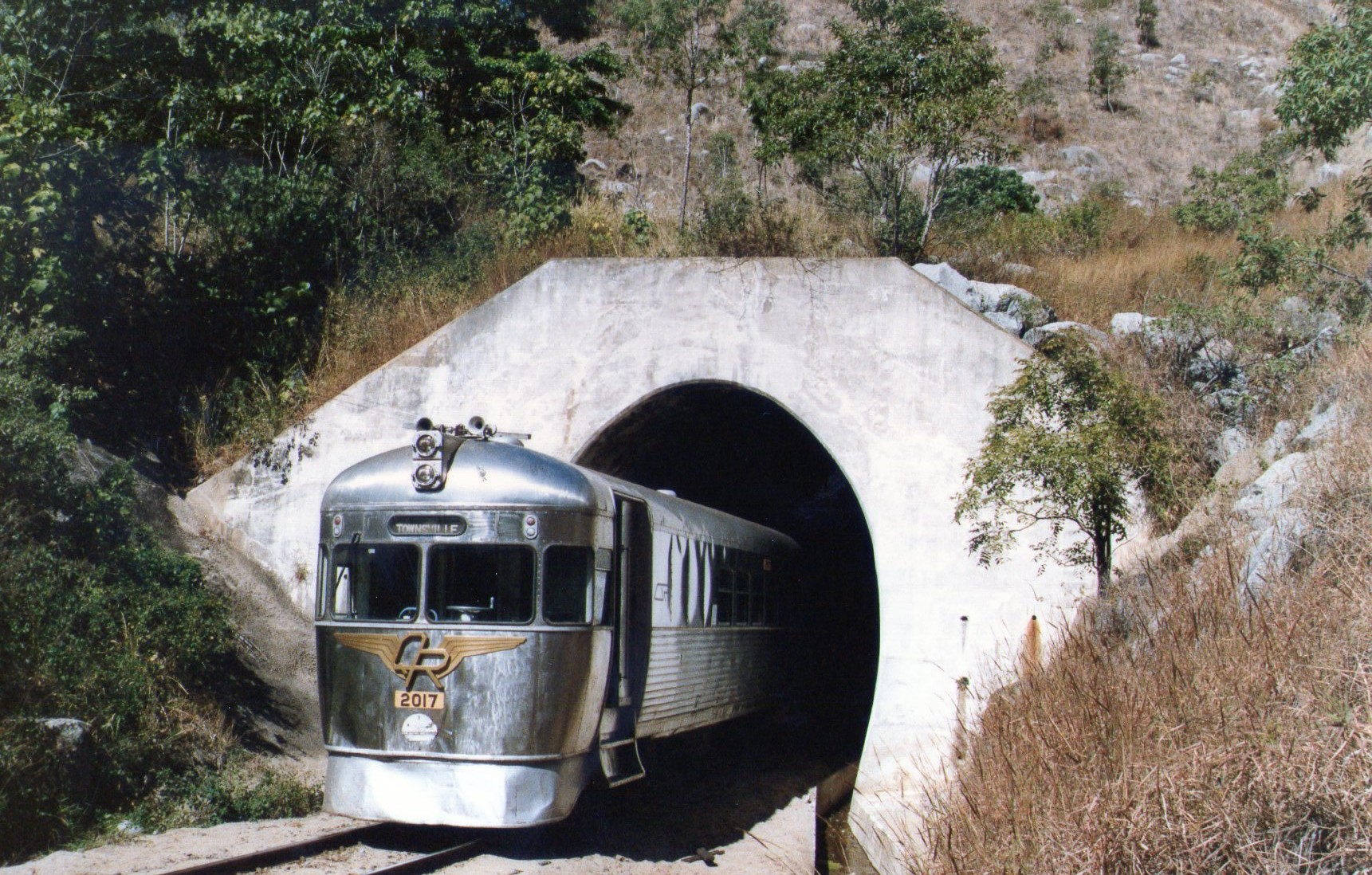
RM 2017 emerges from a tunnel in the Hervey Range on the Greenvale to Yabulu line, ~1991

Construction commenced in 1972 of a branch line from the North Coast railway line at Cobarra, north of Townsville. It was 225 kilometres (140 mi) long. It featured 5 tunnels through the Hervey Range. It was opened in 1974 and operated until 1992 when the mine ran out of ore. Ore was then shipped from New Caledonia to the port of Townsville and railed from there to Yabulu until the refinery closed in 2016.

Proposals were made to try to retain part of the line as a tourist route but nothing came of it. In mid-2000 the railway tracks were removed but other infrastructure such as tunnels and easements remain. The track has been for walking, mountain biking and four-wheel-driving and there have been proposals to formalise this use, but collapses of tunnels along the route have raised safety issues.

== Route ==
The route from the mine to the refinery was:

Coord	Place
18.97312°S 144.94423°E	Greenvale mine loop
18.9739°S 144.9449°E	Greenvale railway station
18.9789°S 144.9975°E	Miners Lake railway station
19.0802°S 145.1866°E	Pilkara railway station
19.1896°S 145.4082°E	Malan railway station
19.24667°S 145.63859°E	Greenvale / Basalt border
19.2354°S 145.6572°E	Tulay railway station
19.23668°S 145.79037°E	Basalt / Paluma border
19.3196°S 145.9668°E	Girrinjah railway station
19.32768°S 145.97419°E	Paluma / Dotswood border
19.4427°S 146.3168°E	Keelbottom railway station
19.43317°S 146.37223°E	Dotswood / Hervey Range border
19.3639°S 146.4362°E	Kadara railway station
19.35553°S 146.45518°E	Hervey Range / Lynam border
19.26299°S 146.55833°E	Lynam / Black River border
19.23739°S 146.58382°E	Black River / Yabulu border
19.20997°S 146.59785°E	Yabulu refinery loop

== In popular culture ==
There are two songs about the line. Stan Coster and Slim Dusty's 1974 song "Three Rivers Hotel" is about its construction.

From Townsville to Greenvale we're building a line
Through the ranges and gorges to the great nickel mine.

Keith Jamieson's 2002 sequel parody "The Ghost of Three Rivers Hotel" is about the line's abandonment. Recorded by Jeff Brown, it won Traditional Bush Ballad of the Year at the Tamworth Songwriters Awards in 2003.

They're holding a sale at the town of Greenvale
They're selling that great railway line.
My memory goes back as they pull up the track
From the coast to that old nickel mine.
