= List of Nadia: The Secret of Blue Water episodes =

Nadia: The Secret of Blue Water (ふしぎの海のナディア, Fushigi no Umi no Nadia; lit. 'Nadia of the Mysterious Seas') is a Japanese animated television series inspired by the works of Jules Verne, particularly Twenty Thousand Leagues Under the Seas and the exploits of Captain Nemo. The series was created by NHK, Toho and Korad, from a concept of Hayao Miyazaki, and directed by Hideaki Anno of Gainax. The opening song is "Blue Water" by Miho Morikawa and the ending song is "Yes I Will" by Miho Morikawa.

Nadia follows a young inventor named Jean and a former circus performer named Nadia, who wishes to return to her home in Africa.

The series aired from 1990 to 1991 and ran for 39 episodes in its original Japanese broadcast. In the United States, it was partially distributed on VHS by Streamline Pictures before ADV Films released the full series on VHS and DVD. ADV's Anime Network also broadcast the series. Following the 2009 closure of ADV, Sentai Filmworks re-licensed the anime series, which was re-released on Blu-ray and DVD in March 2014.

== Episode list ==
No.	Title	Directed by	Written by	Original release date
1	"The Girl at the Eiffel Tower"; Transliteration: "Efferu-tō no shōjo" (Japanese: エッフェル塔の少女)	Yū Kō	Hisao Ōkawa	13 April 1990
It is the first day of the Paris World Exposition in 1889. 14-year-old Jean Rocque Raltique, a brilliant young inventor, arrives at the fair to participate in a flying contest with his uncle. He is distracted, however, when he notices a 14-year-old mysterious dark-skinned girl pass by on a bicycle. Jean follows the girl, known as Nadia, to the Eiffel Tower and tries to make friends with her, but she acts cold and aloof. Just then, three bandits—28-year-old Grandis Granva, a fiery-tempered woman and her two 27-year-old sidekicks, vain, arrogant Sanson, and pudgy, nerdy Hanson—appear and attempt to kidnap Nadia, but she escapes. Jean later finds Nadia performing at a circus across town and is instantly smitten with her performance. At the end of the show, the Grandis gang appear and take Nadia from her (unsympathetic) ringmaster through bribery and pretending to be her sister. After a wild chase, Jean rescues Nadia and earns her trust. Learning she has no place to go, he decides to take his new friend to his home in Le Havre.
2	"The Little Fugitives"; Transliteration: "Chīsana tōbō-sha" (Japanese: 小さな逃亡者)	Shōichi Masuo	Hisao Ōkawa	20 April 1990
Using one of his inventions—a boat that can shift into an automatic hydrofoil ship—Jean successfully makes another escape from the Grandis gang, who are pursuing the pair in their multi-purpose tank, the Gratan. He takes Nadia to his aunt's house in Le Havre, but his grumpy, dour Auntie refuses to take Nadia in. Jean decides to take Nadia to his workshop in Le Havre, and she spends the night there. All the while, Jean learns from Nadia that she wishes to return to the country where she was born. Unfortunately, she has no idea where it is, but her pet lion King suspects it might be in Africa. Jean decides to take Nadia there himself using his all-new aircraft, and they make yet another escape from the Grandis gang. They do not get far, however, when the plane engine falters and the crafts plummets into the ocean.
3	"The Riddle of the Giant Sea Monsters"; Transliteration: "Nazo no daikaijū" (Japanese: 謎の大海獣)	Masayuki	Hisao Ōkawa	27 April 1990
Jean, Nadia, and King are rescued from the ocean by a passing American battleship called the Abraham. Its captain, Melville, and his first mate Holland, are on the trail of a supposed "sea monster" responsible for sinking countless ships in the Pacific Ocean. Jean is intrigued to be aboard the vessel, but Nadia is gravely suspicious. While on the ship, they also meet Ayerton Grenavan, a flamboyant "scientist" who claims to be funding the pursuit. That night, the Abraham is attacked by a mysterious and dangerous presence. A torpedo finally strikes the Abraham, causing Jean, Nadia, King, and their aircraft to be thrown overboard into the ocean again.
4	"Nautilus, The Fantastic Submarine"; Transliteration: "Ban'nō sensuikan Nōchirasu-gō" (Japanese: 万能潜水艦ノーチラス号)	Yoshitomo Yonetani	Hisao Ōkawa	4 May 1990
Adrift on the ocean, Jean, Nadia, and King are once again rescued by another vessel—a mysterious submarine commanded by Captain Nemo and his first officer, Electra. The children are kept aboard the submarine for three days while Nemo and his command crew pursue an enemy submarine (the same "sea monster" that wrecked the Abraham). Eventually, Jean, Nadia, and King are released from the submarine and they set off into the sky on Jean's newly revamped aircraft. Before leaving, the children learn that the submarine is known as the Nautilus.
5	"Marie's Island"; Transliteration: "Marī no shima" (Japanese: マリーの島)	Koji Masunari	Hisao Ōkawa	11 May 1990
While airborne, Jean, Nadia, and King are shot down from the skies and crash-land onto an unfamiliar island. There, they rescue a 4-year-old lonely little girl named Marie, who tells them that her parents have been shot down by a murderous army of masked soldiers. Soon the children are forced to flee from the same soldiers. Marie takes her new "guardians" to a secluded cave containing blankets and supplies. That night, Jean and Nadia bury Marie's fallen parents and tearfully confess to the latter that her parents are dead. Meanwhile, the Grandis gang, having washed up on the island themselves, are taken captive by the soldiers and taken to a shadowy base where they are questioned by the soldiers' commander about the Blue Water, Nadia's pendant.
6	"Infiltration of the Secret Base"; Transliteration: "Kotō no yōsai" (Japanese: 孤島の要塞)	Takeshi Mori	Hisao Ōkawa	18 May 1990
Investigating the island, Jean discovers a trail of power lines leading to a power plant situated in a deep crater at the center of the island. He also witnesses an escaping villager brutally killed by the pursuing soldiers. The next day, Marie and King wander outside the cave to collect flowers (Jean and Nadia debating about their next move—should they rescue the people on the island or not?) and are captured by the soldiers. Jean and Nadia follow them to the crater and find themselves in a complex of factories, where the villagers are forced to work as slaves. They also recognize the "sea monster" as another submarine, known as the Garfish, operated by the soldiers' ruthless ringleader, Gargoyle. While Gargoyle investigates a powerful artifact needed to complete his secret weapon, Nadia's Blue Water is accidentally set off, forcing the children to escape from the factories. To save Jean from being killed, Nadia gives him the Blue Water and turns herself in. Jean promises to rescue her.
7	"The Tower of Babel"; Transliteration: "Baberu no tō" (Japanese: バベルの塔)	Hiroyuki Sasaki	Hisao Ōkawa	25 May 1990
Captured by the soldiers (also known as the Neo Atlanteans), Nadia is taken before Gargoyle, who implies that he has known Nadia since she was a baby. He demands his captive to reveal the whereabouts of the Blue Water. When Nadia refuses to obey, Gargoyle threatens to kill both Marie and King. With no choice, Nadia reluctantly admits that Jean has it. The soldiers begin to search the complex for Jean, while the Grandis gang decides to escape. Both sides inadvertently come across each other when they board a freight train bound for Gargoyle's castle. Gargoyle tours Nadia around the compound and introduces its center—a spiral tower known as Babel, which can obliterate anything in its path. That evening he forces Nadia to witness the tower's awesome powers as it demolishes an island in the distance. Out at sea, Captain Nemo sees the same explosion and declares that Gargoyle has "finally released the great abomination."
8	"Mission to Rescue Nadia"; Transliteration: "Nadia kyūshutsu sakusen" (Japanese: ナディア救出作戦)	Takeshi Mori	Hisao Ōkawa	1 June 1990
In an unexpected turn of events, Jean joins forces with the Grandis gang to infiltrate the compound and rescue Nadia. They almost succeed... until Gargoyle's submarine, Garfish corners them at the intake point. Just when it all looks hopeless, the Nautilus rises from the ocean and attacks the Garfish, allowing the companions to make their escape. In the end, Gargoyle attempts to fight back using the Tower of Babel... but it demolishes his compound instead. The islanders are freed, but Gargoyle makes his getaway on a dirigible.
9	"Nemo's Secret"; Transliteration: "Nemo no himitsu" (Japanese: ネモの秘密)	Yukio Suzuki	Hisao Ōkawa	8 June 1990
The companions are taken aboard the Nautilus by Captain Nemo in gratitude for their bravery against Gargoyle, and to repair the damage the Gratan has taken. Jean and Hanson are thrilled to be aboard the Nautilus because they are intrigued by its technology and wonders, but nobody shares their enthusiasm. Grandis catches a cold and is treated by the doctor. When Captain Nemo and Electra stop by medical bay to check on the sick patient, Grandis falls hopelessly in love with Nemo... much to the dismay of Sanson and Hanson. Later, Nemo crosses paths with Nadia for the first time and acts quite surprised when he sees her... and her Blue Water. It turns out that Nemo happens to have a Blue Water of his own—a larger one with a missing indent.
10	"A Crowning Performance by the Gratan"; Transliteration: "Guratan no katsuyaku" (Japanese: グラタンの活躍)	Jun Kamiya	Hisao Ōkawa	15 June 1990
The Nautilus pursues Gargoyle through the LeMar Straits until it runs into a dangerous trap. The submarine is surrounded on all sides by a field of mines, which can be triggered should the underwater current shifts or if the submarine dares to move. In a race against time, Grandis, Sanson, and Hanson propose to use their Gratan to take out three of the mines so that the Nautilus can safely escape from Gargoyle's trap. However, Sanson knocks Grandis out, fearing for her safety. He and Hanson set aboard the Gratan and begin their mission, but the tank begins to malfunction. Jean, who has sneaked aboard the tank, helps the pair as best as he can, but soon the Gratan's underwater camera shatters, leaving the Gratan blind. With Grandis communicating from the Nautilus bridge, the trio barely manages to succeed and save the submarine from a deadly fate.
11	"New Recruits for the Nautilus"; Transliteration: "Nōchirasu-gō no shin'nyūsei" (Japanese: ノーチラス号の新入生)	Hiroyuki Sasaki	Hisao Ōkawa	22 June 1990
Jean, Nadia, and the others are appointed as apprentice crew members aboard the Nautilus, each assigned to a different position. Jean, Sanson, and Hanson are given lessons by Sonar Officer Eiko Villan about the Nautilus, Marie and King are schooled by Electra (much to the little girl's infuriation), while Grandis and Nadia work in the rather extraordinary kitchen. Grandis tries to impress Nemo by cooking a (rather ugly) platter of fish, but things do not go as she expects. Later, King snatches Grandis's own dinner and there is a wild chase which results with King ending up in the Nautilus's forbidden engine room. When Jean retrieves him, Nemo explains that the Nautilus is powered by a particle annihilation engine that could potentially take them up to the stars... but also destroy the world if used improperly.
12	"Grandis and Her First Love"; Transliteration: "Gurandisu no hatsukoi" (Japanese: グランディスの初恋)	Toshiyuki Kubooka	Hisao Ōkawa	6 July 1990
The Nautilus stops by an island for shore leave to take on new supplies. Humorous complications ensue as Jean accidentally stumbles into Nadia changing into her swimsuit (but they later go on a walk on the beach), Grandis and Electra get into a jealous rivalry for Nemo's love, while Nemo remains oblivious. While Jean goes off on a hunting expedition with Sanson and the others, Nadia bonds with Grandis as the latter explains about a tragic past. As a child, Grandis had grown into a wealthy family and was courted by a handsome man who turned out to be a swindler. She subsequently became obsessed with jewels, which explains why she was chasing after Nadia's Blue Water. But now that she has met Captain Nemo, she no longer sees Nadia's jewel as valuable. That night, the hunting party returns and Sanson throws down the main catch—a murdered baby deer. Nadia is quite upset about this and leaves the camp.
13	"Run, Marie, Run!"; Transliteration: "Hashire! Marī" (Japanese: 走れ！マリー)	Takeshi Mori	Hisao Ōkawa	13 July 1990
Nadia is still angry with everyone over eating the deer, turning a deaf ear to Jean's attempts to reason with her. When Marie innocently states that she "made a grave for the baby deer", Nadia gives the little girl a nasty stare. Marie backs off. Together with King, Marie frolics around the island until she gets hopelessly lost—and far away from camp. They soon discover that Neo-Atlanteans are also at the island and are chased. Marie and King become separated during this adventure. Pursued by a monstrous robotic giant with a mechanical claw, Marie is rescued by Sanson and they struggle to outrun the giant. After a thrilling chase on a mine cart, the pair barely returns to camp unscathed. The walker crashes after them and its pilot emerges from the cockpit, threatening to kill everyone. When the soldier almost shoots Nadia, Nemo takes his revolver and takes him down. Nadia is furious with Nemo for doing so, despite the latter insisting that a soldier was aiming at her.
14	"The Valley of Dinicthys"; Transliteration: "Dinikuchisu no tani" (Japanese: ディニクチスの谷)	Yukio Suzuki	Hisao Ōkawa	20 July 1990
As the Nautilus resumes its pursuit of Gargoyle, both Marie and Nadia become seriously ill from a tropical fever that will claim their lives in two days time if they are not cured. The only hope for a cure is in the depths of Reef 64. Alarmed to learn that Nadia is in danger, Nemo decides to change course, much to Electra's infuriation. Accompanied by Nemo, Jean, Sanson, Hanson, and King set off into a dangerous trek through the underwater domain of Reef 64. They find the herb in a cave situation on the opposite side of a cliff face. On their way back, however, they are attacked by a monstrous eel called a "Dinicthys." Jean and King bravely attempt to draw the Dinicthys away from their position by throwing their diving suits' lights into a void. Thanks to help from Nemo, they succeed, and the girls are cured.
15	"The Nautilus Faces Its Biggest Crisis"; Transliteration: "Nōchirasu saidai no kiki" (Japanese: ノーチラス最大の危機)	Yukio Suzuki	Hisao Ōkawa	27 July 1990
Several days later, the Nautilus falls into an even deadlier trap. First, mines drift into the submarine's intakes and disrupt its engines. Then torpedoes narrowly miss the submarine. A Garfish rams into its side, only to have its nose crippled, and the submarine drifts away, exploding. When the Nautilus attempts to surface, it is surrounded by the American fleet, commanded by vengeful Captain Melville, who has received an anonymous tip that the submarine is responsible for sinking the ships. (Naturally, the "source" of this information is Gargoyle.) The subsequent damage causes the Nautilus to drift to the bottom of the ocean. Because the American fleet wants to see them destroyed, the Nautilus is forced to stay underwater until the fleet departs. Prior to this, a genial sailor named Ensign Fait gives Jean a bouquet of manmade flowers to offer as a present to Nadia, but she rudely turns it down (it reminds her of the flowers from Gargoyle's garden). In the aftermath of the attack, Fait is trapped inside an engine room poisoned by leaking gas, but Nemo orders the room sealed off so as to prevent further damage. Jean is crushed beyond grief as he painfully listens to his new friend die.
16	"The Mystery of the Lost Continent"; Transliteration: "Kieta tairiku no himitsu" (Japanese: 消えた大陸の秘密)	Takeshi Mori	Hisao Ōkawa	24 August 1990
To honor their fallen comrades, the Nautilus sets course for the underwater graveyard of Atlantis. On the way, Nadia begins to question everything that has happened and wonders why she was chosen to wield the Blue Water. Jean learns from Sonar Officer Eiko that the latter was a survivor on a French ship which was sunk by the Garfish. The boy is traumatically shocked when he adds that its captain is none other than his missing father. As the coffins are prepared for burial, Jean wanders off alone and throws away his wrench, deciding that he no longer wishes to invent if technology is so dangerous. Nadia is sad to see him so gloomy and tries to cheer him up. She succeeds by reminding him of the promise he made to her when they were in France. The episode ends when Fait and his comrades are laid to rest in the soil, with Nadia crying on Jean's shoulder.
17	"Jean's New Invention"; Transliteration: "Jan no shin hatsumei" (Japanese: ジャンの新発明)	Takeshi Mori	Hisao Ōkawa	31 August 1990
Jean feels like the Nautilus crew is treating him like a kid and becomes eager to grow up. However, Nemo refuses to make him a crew member, while Electra, and the Grandis gang discourage him even further. Jean is at a loss, until Nadia offers that she has interest in flying again... "only in a craft built by Jean." Inspired, Jean decides to build another aircraft. He aspires to do so all by himself without the help of any grown-ups... a task that he finds more difficult than he anticipated when he cannot get an engine to work. Even so, he refuses help from Hanson, straining his friendship with the latter. Later, however, Jean has a change of heart and decides to ask Hanson for help on making the finest aircraft he can. The aircraft is completed, and Jean takes Nadia on a joyous flight above the clouds. In doing so, he manages to impress Nadia and reassure her that he will get her to Africa someday.
18	"Nautilus vs. Nautilus"; Transliteration: "Nōchirasu tai Nōchirasu-gō" (Japanese: ノーチラス対ノーチラス号)	Shigeto Makino	Hisao Ōkawa; Yasuo Tanami	7 September 1990
To repair the damage caused by the last attack from Gargoyle, Captain Nemo orders the Nautilus to set sail for Antarctica. The passengers are mortified by the thought, especially Sanson, who goes into an exaggerated tirade on what an unstably icy place Antarctica really is. Jean, however, is quite excited by the idea of traveling to a new place. When the submarine arrives at Antarctica, a giant and ancient "shellfish" squid latches onto the Nautilus and threatens to destroy it. The Nautilus attempts to get rid of it by throw a high electric current at it, and then by ramming into an iceberg, to no avail. They finally succeed in losing their menace by steering toward an explosive underwater volcano. Unable to endure the excruciating heat, the shellfish lets go and drifts away. The Nautilus then travels through a tunnel to its subterranean base.
19	"Nemo's Best Friend"; Transliteration: "Nemo no shin'yū" (Japanese: ネモの親友)	Renji Kawabata	Hisao Ōkawa; Yasuo Tanami	14 September 1990
While repairs are made to the Nautilus, Nemo takes Jean and Nadia on a tour of his base. They discover wondrous sights—a massive world tree, frozen dinosaurs, "moving" walkways, and a chamber filled with penguins. But the most spectacular sight of all is a massive (and ancient) whale named Irion, who happens to be close friends with Nemo. When Nadia speaks to the whale, he reveals that the latter will soon find her father... as well as her own brother. The children then witness a breathtaking aurora on the surface of Antarctica with Captain Nemo. The episode ends with Jean sharing his newest invention with Nadia and Marie—a machine that creates ice cream, using the ice from Antarctica.
20	"Jean Makes a Mistake"; Transliteration: "Jan no shippai" (Japanese: ジャンの失敗)	Takeshi Mori	Hisao Ōkawa; Yasuo Tanami	21 September 1990
Jean constructs another invention—a miniature glider powered by a rocket for take off from the Nautilus's deck. Unfortunately, during the test flight, the engine backfires and the glider spirals out of control, finally exploding in the sky. The crew panics, fearing that Gargoyle will probably discover them because of this incident. Sure enough, they are proven right, because Nemo and the others are forced to take down more Garfish submarines. Afterwards, Nemo warns Jean to be more careful with his inventions. Nadia is infuriated to see Jean take Nemo's reprimand without the slightest impulse to stand up for himself, but she goes too far in trying to stand up for him and is slapped by Nemo, especially when she insults him and his crew. Furthermore, Nadia's burgeoning jealousy over Jean's friendship with Electra intensifies... until she finally learns from the latter that she is in no danger of losing Jean. Electra only considers Jean like a little brother she once lost years ago to an attack by an evil man. Nadia recognizes the murderer as Gargoyle, and begins to realize the error of her misjudgment.
21	"Farewell... Nautilus"; Transliteration: "Sayonara... Nōchirasu-gō" (Japanese: さよなら…ノーチラス号)	Fumihiko Takayama	Hisao Ōkawa; Yasuo Tanami	26 October 1990
Trapped in the Kermodec Trench by Gargoyle, the Nautilus barely survives a torpedo assault by six Garfish. Nemo retaliates with a torpedo attack that demolishes the fleet. But Gargoyle springs his newest ace: a super-charged, magnetic weapon called "SeaNet Beam Gun." With excruciating power it literally drags the Nautilus out of the ocean and draws it inexorably toward Gargoyle's Neo-Atlantean battleship in the sky. Then the Nautilus takes devastating damage from the battleship's "atomic vibrator", which all but compromises the submarine's power. Electra suggests self-destructing the Nautilus so as to take them all down with Gargoyle, but Grandis objects, stating that the "real" reason she is doing so is because she "wants to die with Captain Nemo because you know he will never love you!" The Grandis gang pretends to make a getaway in the Gratan but actually perform another heroic rescue by compromising the battleship's missile tube by blasting one of its annihilation bombs just before it hits the Nautilus. Furthermore, Jean rescues Nadia (again) when the latter unwisely tries to surrender herself to Gargoyle (in order to stop the fighting) by using his spare glider. Then the Nautilus engineers manually launch their last missile, which destroys Gargoyle's deadly weapon. The compromised submarine splashes into the ocean and disappears underwater into a whirlpool. Gargoyle, knowing Nemo is doomed, orders another Garfish fleet to finish them off for good.
22	"Electra the Traitor"; Transliteration: "Uragiri no Erekutora" (Japanese: 裏切りのエレクトラ)	Yū Kō	Hisao Ōkawa; Yasuo Tanami	2 November 1990
To save themselves from being totally destroyed by the remaining Garfish fleet, the Nautilus severs its combat block from the main unit, which self-destructs, taking the enemy submarines with it. To save the children, Nemo relocates them to his personal cabin, warning that they will be jettisoned from the doomed Nautilus. Returning to the bridge, Nemo is confronted at gunpoint by Electra, who shoots his arm. Trapped in the cabin, Jean and Nadia listen in shock as Electra describes her tragic past. Thirteen years ago in the kingdom of Tartessos, Nemo's wife, the Queen, was killed in an attack by ruthless rebels led by Gargoyle and his puppet liege, Emperor Neo. Gargoyle attempted to unlock the Tower of Babel's ancient power, but Nemo put a stop to it by removing the Blue Water from its control device. The tower self-destructed and washed away all of Tartessos in seven days. Electra also lost her parents and little brother. Two nights later she was rescued by Nemo. She gradually fell in love with him... until she learned that the latter was responsible for the destruction of Tartessos and the deaths of the innocent people who lived there. Despite her grudge, however, Electra remained loyal to Nemo in mutual understanding of his goal to take down Neo-Atlantis. However, she admits that she was also jealous of Nadia, fearing that the latter would "steal Nemo's heart" away. It is at this point that Nadia realizes that Nemo is actually her father, much to her shock, and she begins to regret the way she treated him. Angry that Nemo has supposedly "gone back to being an ordinary father" and not sacrificing himself to stop Gargoyle, Electra has lost control and attempts to shoot Nemo again. But Nemo admits that he is merely fighting to atone for his sins and that he could not self-destruct the Nautilus because he cares about Electra and does not want to her to suffer the same fate. Ashamed and humiliated, Electra attempts to shoot herself, but Nemo stops her. He then releases the children from the crippled Nautilus, saying "Live, Nadia! Live!"
23	"Young Drifters"; Transliteration: "Chīsana hyōryū-sha" (Japanese: 小さな漂流者)	Takeshi Mori	Hisao Ōkawa; Yasuo Tanami	9 November 1990
Jean, Nadia, Marie, and King are shipwrecked and washed ashore on a beach that turns out to be a deserted island. After much discussion, they decide to stay and make it their home.
24	"Lincoln Island"; Transliteration: "Rinkān shima" (Japanese: リンカーン島)	Shigeto Makino	Hisao Ōkawa; Yasuo Tanami	16 November 1990
Nadia rudely awakens Jean and Marie and takes charge, naming their new home "Lincoln Island" after the president of the same name. Then she abandons them and declares to "live with nature in the forest." Unfortunately, surviving against nature without the benefits of Jean's technology proves to be much more difficult than she expects. Indeed, her only method of finding food is to steal rations the children have taken from Nemo's cabin. Nadia almost drowns when she attempts to reclaim a hologram from Nemo's cabin, but Jean and Marie rescue her. Nadia is furious at both of them, however, because they have caught fish (she would rather have been saved by them). Marie calls Nadia out for her stubbornness, declaring they all would have starved to death otherwise.
25	"The First Kiss"; Transliteration: "Hajimete no kisu" (Japanese: はじめてのキス)	Shigeki Awai	Hisao Ōkawa; Yasuo Tanami	30 November 1990
Because Nadia has stolen food from their camp, all they have left to eat is meat. Nadia refuses to cooperate and declares instead to starve. Later she becomes desperate and finds a can of spinach. Unfortunately the spinach is rotten and Nadia falls ill. Searching for a cure, Jean ends up in a cave where he becomes stoned by hallucinogenic mushrooms, causing him to fall into a trance. Later, Nadia gives Jean his first real kiss—not realizing that he is too delirious (as a result of the aforementioned mushrooms) to know about it.
26	"The Lonely King"; Transliteration: "Hitoribotchi no Kingu" (Japanese: ひとりぼっちのキング)	Renji Kawabata	Hisao Ōkawa; Yasuo Tanami	7 December 1990
Nadia spends a whole day being romantic with Jean, culminating with another kiss under the stars—until Jean thinks it is their first time, much to her infuriation. Jealous of the attention Nadia is giving Jean, King runs away (especially after Marie abuses him). When Jean sets off to find him, he steps off a cliff and falls to the ground, and has an extensive dream sequence in which he is unveiling invention after invention before an adoring Nadia and Marie. Among his inventions are a gravity bomb and another highly advanced flying machine (straight out of Thunderbirds).
27	"The Island of the Witch"; Transliteration: "Majo no iru shima" (Japanese: 魔女のいる島)	Tadayuki Uda	Hisao Ōkawa; Yasuo Tanami	14 December 1990
A typhoon strikes Lincoln Island, and King is blown away into the night. In the aftermath of the storm, the children are surprised to discover a floating island drifting to their shore. When they explore the island—which turns out to be a rather bizarre tropical paradise of trees of every sort, desert dunes, and shifting weathers, the children spot both King as well as Ayerton, who tells them crazy stories about the island and reveals he ended up ashore when the American Navy sunk the Nautilus. He warns them that there is a deep mystery at the heart of the island.
28	"The Floating Island"; Transliteration: "Nagasare shima" (Japanese: 流され島)	Renji Kawabata	Hisao Ōkawa; Yasuo Tanami	21 December 1990
A giant appears out of nowhere and terrorizes the companions... which turns out to be the Gratan disguised in cloth, and sure enough, Grandis, Sanson, and Hanson are there. The children decide to stay with their friends and are soon living together like a family. Nadia even tries to cook for Jean (perhaps to make amends for all the trouble she caused him).
29	"King vs. King"; Transliteration: "Kingu tai Kingu" (Japanese: キング対キング)	Shigeto Makino	Hisao Ōkawa; Yasuo Tanami	11 January 1991
Sanson and Hanson get into an argument that turns into a race between two mechanical lions resembling King. In between this, Nadia finally reveals why she dislikes eating meat so much: years ago when she was in the circus, her friend Smoky, a goat, was taken away because he was too old to do anymore labor. The subsequent incident caused Nadia to understand what animals say. She adds that seeing people eat meat is like watching a friend being murdered.
30	"Labyrinth in the Earth"; Transliteration: "Chitei no meiro" (Japanese: 地底の迷路)	Takeshi Mori	Hisao Ōkawa; Yasuo Tanami	25 January 1991
Four months later, the Gratan has finally been repaired and the companions will soon set off for Africa. But first the balloon must be repaired. While Ayerton tries to seduce Grandis, Jean and Nadia make a remarkable discovery about their island home: there is an underground factory which resembles their former subaquatic home. While exploring, Nadia falls into a trance and mysteriously disappears behind a wall, leaving her clothes in Jean's hands.
31	"Farewell, Red Noah"; Transliteration: "Saraba, Reddo Noa" (Japanese: さらば、レッドノア)	Hiromitsu Hoshino	Hisao Ōkawa; Yasuo Tanami	1 February 1991
Trapped in a strange void, Nadia comes into contact with a mysterious voice who tells her that she is actually aboard Red Noah, a satellite city that descended to the depths of the ocean 2,400,000 years ago. Communicating with the mysterious identity, Nadia learns that she is, in fact, an heir to the throne of the Atlantis... and that she is not a human being. Furthermore, her real birthplace turns out to be Old Tartessos, the ancient kingdom Atlantis that was destroyed thirteen years ago. After learning about the history of her people, Nadia is told that she will be taken to the underwater kingdom of Atlantis to "guide the lost souls toward its restoration." The island begins to collapse and crumble, and the companions are forced to flee. But Jean stays behind and bravely returns to the same place where Nadia disappeared moments earlier, calling her name. Nadia realizes that Jean is more important to her than the Blue Water and is forced to admit it to the mysterious voice. Nadia is released, but warned that she cannot escape from her destiny, which is to rule over Atlantis, or use the power of the Blue Water to become a "god" or "devil." Nadia is overjoyed to see Jean and tearfully embraces him. The pair flee the cave and are almost swallowed up by the sinking island, but the Gratan comes to their rescue. Reunited, the companions watch as the island disappears into the ocean for good.
32	"Nadia's First Love...?"; Transliteration: "Nadia no hatsukoi...?" (Japanese: ナディアの初恋…?)	Hiromitsu Hoshino	Hisao Ōkawa; Yasuo Tanami	8 February 1991
The Gratan crash-lands into a tribal village, and the companions are captured... until one of its citizens recognizes both Nadia and her Blue Water. Nadia seems intrigued... that is, until she discovers that the warrior (who knows about Tartessos) is engaged to a bulky, strong warrior woman.
33	"King's Rescue"; Transliteration: "Kingu kyūjo sakusen" (Japanese: キング救助作戦)	Renji Kawabata	Hisao Ōkawa; Yasuo Tanami	15 February 1991
King is captured by Grandis's ex-fiance, and the companions form a rescue operation to free him.
34	"My Darling Nadia ♥ (Series Recap)"; Transliteration: "Itoshi no Nadia ♥ (Sōshūhen)" (Japanese: いとしのナディア♥（総集編）)	Tadayuki Uda; Akio Satsukawa	Hisao Ōkawa; Yasuo Tanami	22 February 1991
Most of this episode is a "clip show" featuring "image songs" accompanied by clips from the previous thirty-three episodes while Sanson suggests Jean to write a love song for Nadia.
35	"The Secret of Blue Water"; Transliteration: "Burū uōtā no himitsu" (Japanese: ブルー・ウォーターの秘密)	Hiromitsu Hoshino; Mahiro Maeda	Hisao Ōkawa; Yasuo Tanami	1 March 1991
Finally, the companions arrive at Tartessos, the ancient kingdom of Atlantis submerged to the bottom of a crater lake thirteen years ago. Exploring its ruins, Nadia reveals to the companions that they are, in truth, aboard Blue Noah, one of three "Noah's Arc" vessels that descended to the ocean thousands of years ago. The other two are Red Noah and Atlantis, respectively. During their exploration, Nadia reveals her identity as a princess of Atlantis and the dangers of the Blue Water. Whoever wields the pendant, it turns out, can either become god or devil... and destroy the world in a fit of rage. She also reveals that she does not want to have anything to do with her destiny and feels like she is a horrible person who brings nothing but misery to everyone. Impulsively, Nadia attempts suicide by stepping off the top of a tall tower. A few moments later she awakens to find herself on solid ground. Jean reveals that the Blue Water lit up during Nadia's fall and slowed her descent. Nadia laments that she cannot escape her fate after all. Everyone is shocked and traumatized by Nadia's latest actions, but Jean pacifies the situation by telling Nadia he loves her regardless of who she is, and forgives her past mistakes. Nadia is deeply touched by Jean's honesty, and learns that they have, in fact, arrived on her 15th birthday.
36	"The New Nautilus"; Transliteration: "Ban'nō senkan N-Nōchirasu-gō" (Japanese: 万能戦艦Ν-ノーチラス号)	Hiromitsu Hoshino	Hisao Ōkawa; Yasuo Tanami	8 March 1991
Gargoyle's Neo Atlantean battleships have trailed the companions to Tartessos. Nadia surrenders herself and the Blue Water to Gargoyle... but not before making the latter promise to spare her friends. Gargoyle goes back on his word anyway and orders his battleships to attack the companions. Jean and the others try to flee in the Gratan until they find themselves falling inexorably into a bottomless shaft. Just then, a mysterious force field snags the tank in mid-air and lands them safely on the ground. Their rescuer turns out to be none other than Electra, who informs them that Captain Nemo is still alive and well. She takes the companions aboard New Nautilus, a super-charged massive battleship with powerful electromagnetic turrets. However, the confrontation between Nemo and Gargoyle does not go well, and results with the captain reluctantly surrendering his own Blue Water to his enemy. Gargoyle then destroys Tartessos with a powerful blast and takes Nadia into the skies.
37	"Emperor Neo"; Transliteration: "Neo kōtei" (Japanese: ネオ皇帝)	Shigeto Makino; Takeshi Mori	Hisao Ōkawa; Yasuo Tanami	29 March 1991
Nadia is brought aboard Red Noah again, this time as it hovers in the sky, dwarfing even Gargoyle's battleships. There Gargoyle shows Nadia the ancient history of Atlantis, including an experimental massive "human" called Adam, and failed creations hovering in jars. She also meets Emperor Neo, who turns out to be none other than her long-lost brother—a mechanical puppet under Gargoyle's control. Meanwhile, the New Nautilus has survived the destruction of Tartessos and sets off to fight back. Neo threatens the people around the world to surrender England, but just as the weapon fires, the New Nautilus intervenes, and the two crafts are face to face.
38	"To the Sky..."; Transliteration: "Sora e..." (Japanese: 宇宙(そら)へ…)	Masayuki	Hisao Ōkawa; Yasuo Tanami	5 April 1991
Both Red Noah and New Nautilus exchange laser fire and turret blasts in the sky. The subsequent battle causes much damage to the streets of Paris, destroying the Eiffel Tower. Eventually both crafts elevate to outer space. However, New Nautilus cannot take down Red Noah because the latter's powerful force field is still intact. Breaching a hole in Red Noah 's defenses, the Nautilus sends the Gratan into Red Noah. Grandis, Sanson, and Hanson traverse through the spaceship's corridors, cutting holes in the bulkheads with the tank's newly installed laser turrets. After a long chase they discover Red Noah 's power plant and sacrifice the Gratan to take down Red Noah 's barrier. New Nautilus breaches Red Noah, and Nemo, Electra, and Jean confront Gargoyle in a massive, observatory like chamber. Standing on pedestals more than two meters wide and a hundred meters above the floor, the trio is horrified to discover that Nadia is now under Gargoyle's control.
39	"Successor to the Stars..."; Transliteration: "Hoshi o tsugu mono..." (Japanese: 星を継ぐ者…)	Takeshi Mori	Hisao Ōkawa; Yasuo Tanami	12 April 1991
Both Neo and Nadia shoot Nemo, wounding him. Electra radios the New Nautilus to blast through the throne room. The subsequent explosion compromises Gargoyle's hold on Neo, who recognizes his father. Using his powers, Neo returns the Blue Waters to their rightful owners and approaches Nadia in order to break the crown that is controlling her mind. Just when he reaches the throne, however, he freezes—Gargoyle has unplugged his source of energy. Using all his will, Neo breaks through and succeeds in freeing his sister. In doing so, he sacrifices himself. Then Gargoyle tortures Electra with deadly volts and causes Jean to fall to his death. The New Nautilus breaches the throne room and blasts at Gargoyle. Nemo gives Nadia his own Blue Water and explains that she can revive Jean if she prays to the Blue Water. With encouragement from Grandis and Electra, Nadia combines both Blue Waters, and its powers form a sphere of light. Ignoring Nemo's warning that only an Atlantean can withstand the power of the Blue Water, Gargoyle staggers toward the sphere and touches it... and his own being literally turns into salt and disintegrates—he was a human being all along. Nadia successfully brings Jean back to life. Nemo then sacrifices himself to destroy Red Noah as the companions return to Earth aboard an all new submarine spaceship. 12 years later in 1902, a 17-year-old Marie talks about how the companions have gone their separate ways: Grandis is single, Hanson a wealthy businessman, Electra a mother and the new captain of the Nautilus and Jean and Nadia are happily married. Meanwhile, Marie has married Sanson and is expecting her firstborn child.
