= Pandora Reef =

Island and fringing reef in Halifax Bay, Queensland, Australia

- Interactive map of Pandora Reef

Geography
- Coordinates: 18.81248°S 146.43312°E

Administration
- Australia
- State: Queensland

Pandora Reef is a low-lying island in addition to being an adjacent fringing reef. It is in Halifax Bay in Queensland, Australia. It is 13 kilometres (8.1 mi) from the Greater Palm group. The name Pandora Reef dates back to at least 1889.

The surrounding waters are in the Great Barrier Reef Marine Park in the Coral Sea. The Great Barrier Reef Marine Park Authority designation is 18-051. Zoned as a Marine National Park, fishing is not permitted, although diving and photography are allowed.

== Aerial photos and maps ==
- "Pandora Reef, the island, and Pandora Reef, the reef" (Map). Google Maps.
- "satellite view of Pandora Reef" (Map). Google Maps.

== See also ==
- Halifax Bay Wetlands National Park
- Fly Island

== Bibliography ==
- Done, Terry; Turak, Emre; Wakeford, Mary; Devantier, Lyndon; McDonald, Abbi; Fisk, David (2007). "Decadal changes in turbid-water coral communities at Pandora Reef: Loss of resilience or too soon to tell?". Coral Reefs. 26 (4): 789–805. Bibcode:2007CorRe..26..789D. doi:10.1007/s00338-007-0265-3. S2CID 21247413.
