= Queensland Nickel =

Australian company

- Type: Private
- Industry: Mineral Refinery
- Founded: July 1971
- Defunct: March 17, 2026
- Fate: Liquidated
- Headquarters: Townsville, Australia
- Products: Nickel

Queensland Nickel was a company which owned and operated the nickel and cobalt refinery at Yabulu in North Queensland, Australia. The company was established in July 1971. In 1997 the company was purchased by Gencor's Billiton subsidiary, which was later merged with BHP. Billionaire Clive Palmer acquired the company in 2009. On 19 January 2016 the company entered into voluntary administration. In April 2016 the company's creditors voted for liquidation. The company's business registration was cancelled on 17 March 2026.

== Operations ==
The refinery carried out two operations: ore processing and refining using the energy intensive Caron Process. Imported ore used in these two operations was received via rail from a facility at the Port of Townsville.

When operating at full capacity, the refinery was responsible for over $1 billion of output in the North Queensland economy.

== History ==
The company was established in July 1971. The Yabulu Nickel Refinery was completed in 1974, after geologists commenced exploration of the Greenvale deposit, an area originally mapped by officers of the Bureau of Mineral Resources in 1957. The Greenvale railway line was built to transport the ore from Greenvale to the refinery in Yabulu.

In 1986, the first test shipments of Nickel ore from Indonesia and New Caledonia were processed at the refinery with regular shipments starting in 1988 and 1989. It was in 1989 that the refinery's internationally patented ammoniac AL solvent extraction technology was introduced to the refining process to significantly improve the separation of nickel and cobalt. In 1992, mining ceased at Greenvale, and by 1995, all ore being processed at the refinery was imported, until 2007, when ore from Western Australia was added to the refinery's sources.

Queensland Premier, Anna Bligh, asked Clive Palmer to purchase the refinery and save jobs in North Queensland. Palmer acquired the refinery in 2009 from BHP Billiton. As part of the purchase, Palmer had to personally guarantee over $3 billion to ensure workers' jobs were safe. According to a 2016 report, the refinery's operations employed 780 people and were indirectly responsible for another 1190 full-time equivalent jobs in North Queensland, and generated an estimated $1.1 billion for the region's economy.

When the operation was first acquired by Palmer in 2009, the cost of production was over $8 per pound. During the course of the next five years, the manager and director Clive Mensink (Palmer's nephew) was responsible for the reduction in the cost of production to $4.40 per pound. This price however was revealed to have been achieved through the sacking of over 200 workers and reports of safety gaps leading to an explosion shortly before administration was announced.

=== Environmental issues ===
A freedom of information request by the Northern Queensland Conservation Council in 2014 showed that Queensland Nickel discharged nitrate-laden water into the Great Barrier Reef in 2009 and 2011—releasing 516 tonnes (508 long tons; 569 short tons) of toxic waste water on the latter occasion. In June 2012, Queensland Nickel stated it intended to release waste water, continuously for three months, "at least 100 times the allowed maximum level as well as heavy metals and other contaminants". A Great Barrier Reef Marine Park Authority (GBRMPA) briefing stated the company had "threatened a compensation claim of $6.4bn should the GBRMPA intend to exert authority over the company's operations". In response to the publication of the dumping incidents, the GBRMPA stated:

We have strongly encouraged the company to investigate options that do not entail releasing the material to the environment and to develop a management plan to eliminate this potential hazard; however, GBRMPA does not have legislative control over how the Yabulu tailings dam is managed.

=== Financial troubles ===
Despite having previously ruled-out requesting government funding, Palmer requested taxpayer-funded assistance from the Queensland Government in late 2015 to guarantee a loan of A$35 million for the redundancies. However the government rejected the request, citing the refusal of the company to share full details with the government and its large donations to Palmer's Palmer United Party. Despite its financial troubles, Queensland Nickel donated more than $20 million to the Palmer United Party in two years including a donation of $288,516 days before the workers were terminated. On 15 January 2016 the company Queensland Nickel Pty Ltd terminated 237 workers. The company blamed poor nickel prices, which were at a twelve-year low and the refusal of the Queensland Government to support industry and jobs in North Queensland.

In March 2016, it was proposed by Palmer to transfer the employment of hundreds of employees, including their entitlements, to a new company Queensland Nickel Sales, a joint venture between two of Clive Palmer's companies, QNI Resources Pty Ltd and QNI Metals Pty Ltd, with Mensink as director. The plan was that the new company would continue to operate the refinery and would pay the outstanding expenses incurred during the administration, but required the administrator to agree transfer the cash held in the Queensland Nickel Pty Ltd bank account. In a sworn affidavit, Kelly-Anne Trenfield explained why the administrators would not agree to this transfer of cash.

After a report by the administrators on Clive Palmer and Queensland Nickel on 11 April 2016, politicians and media from around the country criticised Palmer. In early April 2016 the administrators, FTI Consulting, found that the company had "incurred debts of $771 million after going insolvent in November". On 22 April 2016 the company's creditors voted to liquidate it.

In April 2018, Palmer claimed the attempts by liquidators to recoup $66 million in taxpayer funds used to compensate former employees following the abrupt 2016 closure of the refinery were "a politically motivated witch hunt" and launched a counter claim, suing the liquidators for $1.8 billion in damages.

On 29 June 2018, Palmer held a press conference in Townsville to address the claims against him and announced his intention to re-open the refinery and create hundreds of jobs. He further announced that there was an estimated $6 billion (at the then-current price) worth of cobalt in the tailings dams onsite.

In August 2019, Palmer settled and agreed to pay back the $66 million sought by liquidators to cover the cost of sacked workers' entitlements.

In 2021 appeal courts ordered Palmer to pay a further $102M to outstanding QNI creditors.

In December 2022, Palmer announced his intention to sell the refinery property to a Swiss-Australian company called Zero Carbon Investek, a corporation which was subsequently deregistered by ASIC in 2024.

In June 2024, the liquidator responsible for handling Queensland Nickel's outstanding debts announced that, after eight years of legal battles, all creditors had been repaid.

== In popular culture ==
The subject of the Slim Dusty song "Three Rivers Hotel" is the building of the railway line from the Greenvale Mine to the Yabulu Refinery in the early 1970s.

== See also ==
- Mining in Australia
