= Yabulu, Queensland =

Yabulu
- Town
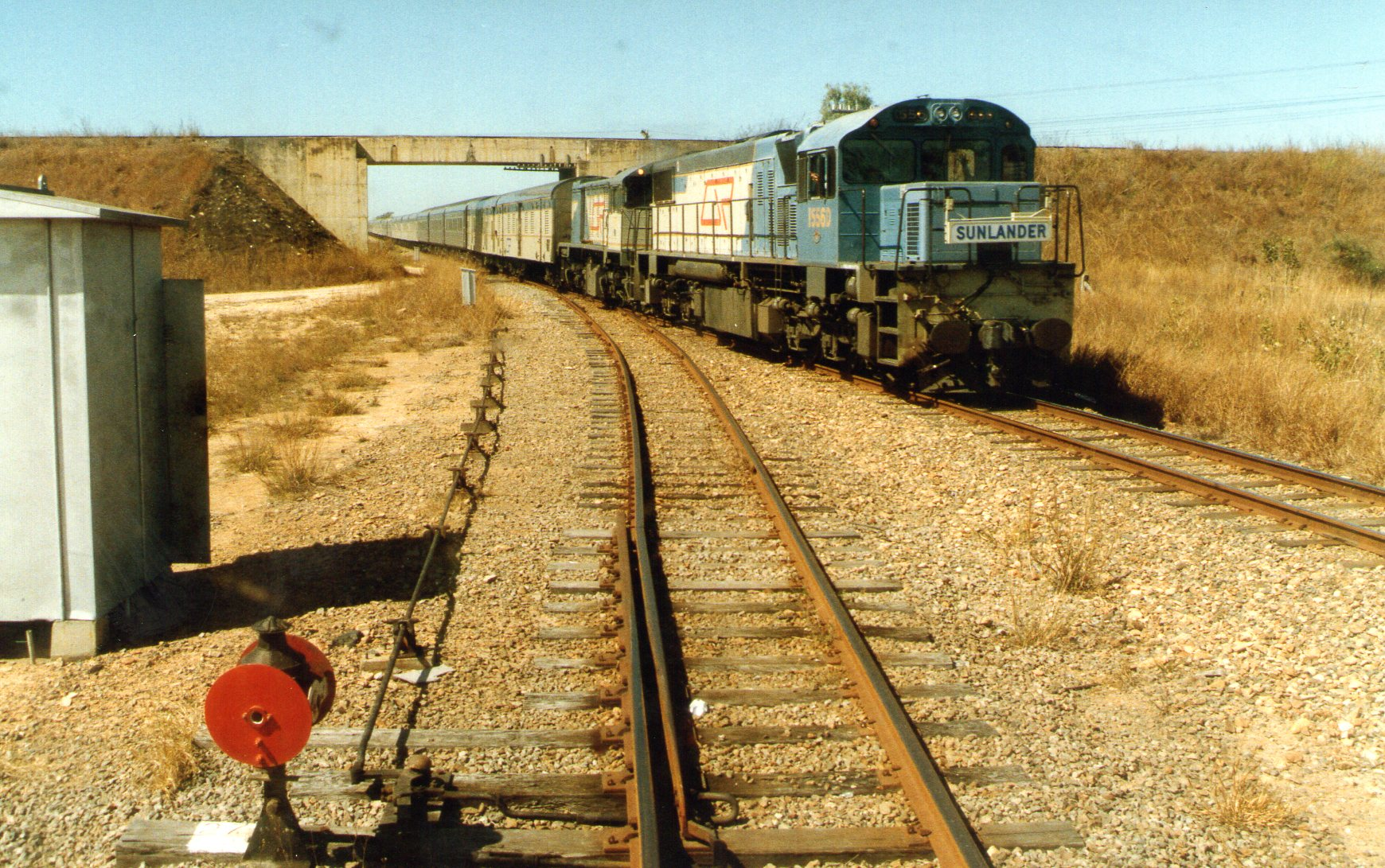
- QR loco 1556 and a 1720 class haul the Sunlander northbound through Yabulu, circa 1991

- Interactive map of Yabulu
- Coordinates: 19.2136°S 146.6016°E
- Country: Australia
- State: Queensland
- City: Townsville
- LGA: City of Townsville
- Location: 8.9 km (5.5 mi) WNW of Deeragun; 29.4 km (18.3 mi) WNW of Townsville CBD; 322 km (200 mi) SSE of Cairns; 1,365 km (848 mi) NNW of Brisbane

Government
  - State electorate: Thuringowa
  - Federal division: Herbert

Area
  - Total: 35.4 km^{2} (13.7 sq mi)

Population
  - Total: 719 (2021 census)
  - Density: 20.31/km^{2} (52.60/sq mi)
- Time zone: UTC+10:00 (AEST)
- Postcode: 4818
Localities around Yabulu
Bluewater	Saunders Beach	Coral Sea
Bluewater	Yabulu	Beach Holm
Lynam	Black River	Black River

Yabulu is a town and coastal suburb in the City of Townsville, Queensland, Australia. In the 2021 census, the suburb of Yabulu had a population of 719 people.

== Geography ==
Yabulu is approximately 25 kilometres (16 mi) by road north-west of the Townsville CBD.

The suburb is bounded to the north-east by Halifax Bay (part of the Coral Sea), to the south-east loosely by Alick Creek, and to the south-west, west, and north-west by Althaus Creek (19.15250°S 146.60167°E), which flows into Halifax Bay.

The Bruce Highway passes through the suburb.

Yabulu is the site of a defunct nickel and cobalt refinery, owned by Clive Palmer. The refinery is located on the Cobarra railway loop (19.2°S 146.6°E).

Mount Saunders is in the centre of the locality (19.1972°S 146.5975°E) and is 92 metres (302 ft) above sea level.

There are two railway lines passing through the locality, the North Coast railway line and the now-closed Greenvale railway line. The locality has the following railway stations on the North Coast line:

- Purono railway station (19.1964°S 146.5827°E)
- Yabulu railway station(19.2123°S 146.6038°E)

and one at the nickel refinery from which processed ore was carried to the Port of Townsville via the North Coast line

- Cobarra railway station (19.2029°S 146.6048°E)

== History ==
Yabulu is situated in the traditional Wulgurukaba Aboriginal country, nearby Nyawigi Aboriginal country.

The town takes its name from Yabulu railway station. Yabulu is an Aboriginal word meaning grass. Nickel laterite mining at Greenvale led to the building of the Greenvale railway line to transport ore to a nickel refinery at Yabulu in the 1970s.

== Demographics ==
In the 2016 census, the suburb of Yabulu had a population of 697 people. 78.1% of people were born in Australia and 86.4% of people spoke only English at home. The most common responses for religion were Catholic 25.1%, No Religion 24.4% and Anglican 19.2%.

In the 2021 census, the suburb of Yabulu had a population of 719 people.

== Palmer Nickel and Cobalt Refinery ==
The Palmer Nickel and Cobalt Refinery was operated by Queensland Nickel. The Yabulu refinery became operational in 1974 after completion of the Greenvale to Yabulu railway line. Mining at Greenvale took place between 1974 and 1992 during which nickel laterite ore was transported to the Yabulu refinery by rail and processed up until 1993. Importation of ore from mines in New Caledonia, Indonesia, and the Philippines began in 1986 and continued until 2016.

In 2009, Clive Palmer bought Queensland Nickel and the Palmer Nickel and Cobalt Refinery. The following year, the company increased production by 30%, prompting him to give $10 million worth of Christmas bonuses to staff, including 55 Mercedes-Benz B-Class cars and overseas holidays. Up to 750 people worked at the refinery, which produced 32,000 tonnes (71,000,000 lb) of nickel and 19,000 t (42,000,000 lb) of cobalt per year. According to the general manager Trefor Flood, this figure had risen to 12,000 t (26,000,000 lb) of nickel per month by early 2010.

In 2013, World Wide Fund for Nature Australia (WWF) raised concerns that a tailings dam at the site could collapse during the wet season, posing an environmental threat to the Great Barrier Reef. WWF later retracted their comments, apologised and agreed to pay legal costs incurred by Palmer who sued WWF because of the comments.

On 15 January 2016 the company terminated 237 workers. Palmer blamed poor nickel prices, at a 12-year low, and the refusal of the Queensland government to guarantee a loan of A$35 million, but the ABC reported that Queensland Nickel had donated over $6 million to the Palmer United Party. The leader of the opposition in Queensland supported the government's refusal to guarantee the loan on the grounds that it was not the proper role of government and that Palmer had used Queensland Nickel funds for his political party. On 18 January 2016 Queensland Nickel entered voluntary administration.

In March 2016, the remaining employees of the refinery were sacked, and the refinery shuttered. The company has since been liquidated, and its business registration cancelled.

== Education ==
There are no schools in Yabulu. The nearest government primary schools are Bluewater State School in neighbouring Bluewater to the north-west and Bohlevale State School in Burdell to the east. The nearest government secondary school is Northern Beaches State High School in Deeragun to the south-east.

== Attractions ==
Bluewater Caravan Park is at 41420 Bruce Highway.

== Purono Park ==
Purono Park is a residential area situated on the western edge of Yabulu, between Heely Creek and Althaus Creek, the latter of which forms the boundary between Bluewater and Yabulu. It is approximately 25 kilometres (16 mi) west-by-north of the Townsville city centre. It is named for the former Purono rail siding, which in turn was named for a word said to mean 'feather' in an unrecorded Aboriginal dialect. It is accessed via Purono Parkway, and runs north from the Bruce Highway.

Despite sometimes being treated as a separate suburb from Yabulu, Purono Park does not seem to have ever been officially gazetted as such.

Purono Park is home to the Bluewater Medical Practice, the Bluewater Caravan Park, and the Purono Rural Fire Brigade.

== See also ==
- Ravensthorpe Nickel Mine
- Townsville Power Station
