= Lynam, Queensland =

Lynam
- Suburb
- Interactive map of Lynam
- Coordinates: 19.2488°S 146.5472°E
- Country: Australia
- State: Queensland
- LGA: City of Townsville
- Location: 18.1 km (11.2 mi) W of Deeragun; 33.0 km (20.5 mi) W of Townsville CBD; 1,474 km (916 mi) NNW of Brisbane

Government
  - State electorate: Hinchinbrook
  - Federal divisions: Herbert; Kennedy

Area
  - Total: 179.2 km^{2} (69.2 sq mi)

Population
  - Total: 8 (2021 census)
  - Density: 0.0446/km^{2} (0.116/sq mi)
- Time zone: UTC+10:00 (AEST)
- Postcode: 4818
Suburbs around Lynam
Clemant	Bluewater Park; Blue Hills	Bluewater; Yabulu
Paluma	Lynam	Black River
Hervey Range	Hervey Range	Hervey Range

Lynam is a rural locality in the City of Townsville, Queensland, Australia. In the 2021 census, Lynam had a population of 8 people.

== Geography ==
Most of the locality is undeveloped mountainous land with a number of named peaks (from north to south):

- Notch Peak (19.2770°S 146.5506°E) 146 metres (479 ft)
- Mount Black (19.2803°S 146.5625°E) 410 metres (1,350 ft)
- Mount Cataract (19.2872°S 146.5080°E) 721 metres (2,365 ft)

The northwestern part of the locality is within the Paluma Range National Park. The central part is within the Clemant State Forest. Apart from these protected areas, the predominant land use is grazing on native vegetation.

The now-closed Greenvale railway line passes through the locality; there were no stations on it within the locality.

== History ==
The locality was officially named and bounded on 27 July 1991.

== Demographics ==
In the 2016 census, Lynam had "no people or a very low population".

In the 2021 census, Lynam had a population of 8 people.

== Education ==
There are no schools in Lynam. The nearest government primary school is Bluewater State School in neighbouring Bluewater to the north-east. The nearest government secondary schools are Northern Beaches State High School in Deeragun to the east and Thuringowa State High School in Condon to the south-east.
