= Blue Hills, Queensland =

Blue Hills
- Suburb
- Interactive map of Blue Hills
- Coordinates: 19.2491°S 146.4958°E
- Country: Australia
- State: Queensland
- LGA: City of Townsville
- Location: 10.7 km (6.6 mi) SW of Bluewater; 27.7 km (17.2 mi) W of Deeragun; 42.9 km (26.7 mi) WNW of Townsville CBD; 1,404 km (872 mi) NNW of Brisbane

Government
  - State electorate: Hinchinbrook
  - Federal division: Herbert

Area
  - Total: 31.1 km^{2} (12.0 sq mi)
- Time zone: UTC+10:00 (AEST)
- Postcode: 4818
Suburbs around Blue Hills
Bluewater Park	Bluewater Park	Lynam
Lynam	Blue Hills	Lynam
Lynam	Lynam	Lynam

Blue Hills is a rural locality in the City of Townsville, Queensland, Australia.

== Geography ==
The land use is grazing on native vegetation.

== History ==
The locality was officially named and bounded on 27 July 1991.

== Demographics ==
The population of Blue Hills is not separately reported in the Australian census. It is included in the census data for its neighbouring locality Bluewater.

== Education ==
There are no schools in Blue Hills. The nearest government primary school is Bluewater State School in Bluewater to the north-east. The nearest government secondary school is Northern Beaches State High School in Deeragun in Townsville.
