= Bluewater Park, Queensland =

Bluewater Park
- Suburb
- Interactive map of Bluewater Park
- Coordinates: 19.1961°S 146.4847°E
- Country: Australia
- State: Queensland
- City: Bluewater
- LGA: City of Townsville
- Location: 22.8 km (14.2 mi) WNW of Deeragun; 37.8 km (23.5 mi) WNW of Townsville CBD; 1,391 km (864 mi) NNW of Brisbane
- Established: 1991

Government
  - State electorate: Hinchinbrook
  - Federal divisions: Herbert; Kennedy

Area
  - Total: 43.8 km^{2} (16.9 sq mi)

Population
  - Total: 1,066 (2021 census)
  - Density: 24.34/km^{2} (63.03/sq mi)
- Time zone: UTC+10:00 (AEST)
- Postcode: 4818
Suburbs around Bluewater Park
Clemant	Bluewater	Bluewater
Clemant	Bluewater Park	Lynam
Lynam	Blue Hills	Lynam

Bluewater Park is a suburb of Bluewater in the City of Townsville, Queensland, Australia. In the 2021 census, Bluewater Park had a population of 1,066 people.

== Geography ==
The suburb is to the immediate south-west of the Bluewater township, approximately 33 kilometres (21 mi) WNW of Townsville.

The Bluewater Park district is made up of the residential housing area on the southern end of Forestry Road, beginning approximately halfway down the road at the turnoff to Bluemountain Drive. However, the community recreational area that also goes by the name of "Bluewater Park" is situated in the actual township of Bluewater.

== History ==
The locality was named and bounded on 27 July 1991. It was designated a suburb on 28 February 2003.

== Demographics ==
In the 2011 census, Bluewater Park had a population of 903 people.

In the 2016 census, Bluewater Park had a population of 992 people.

In the 2021 census, Bluewater Park had a population of 1,066 people.

== Education ==
There are no schools in Bluewater Park. The nearest government primary school is Bluewater State School in neighbouring Bluewater to the north-west. The nearest government secondary school is Northern Beaches State High School in Deeragun to the south-east.
