= Halifax Bay =

Coastal region of Queensland, Australia

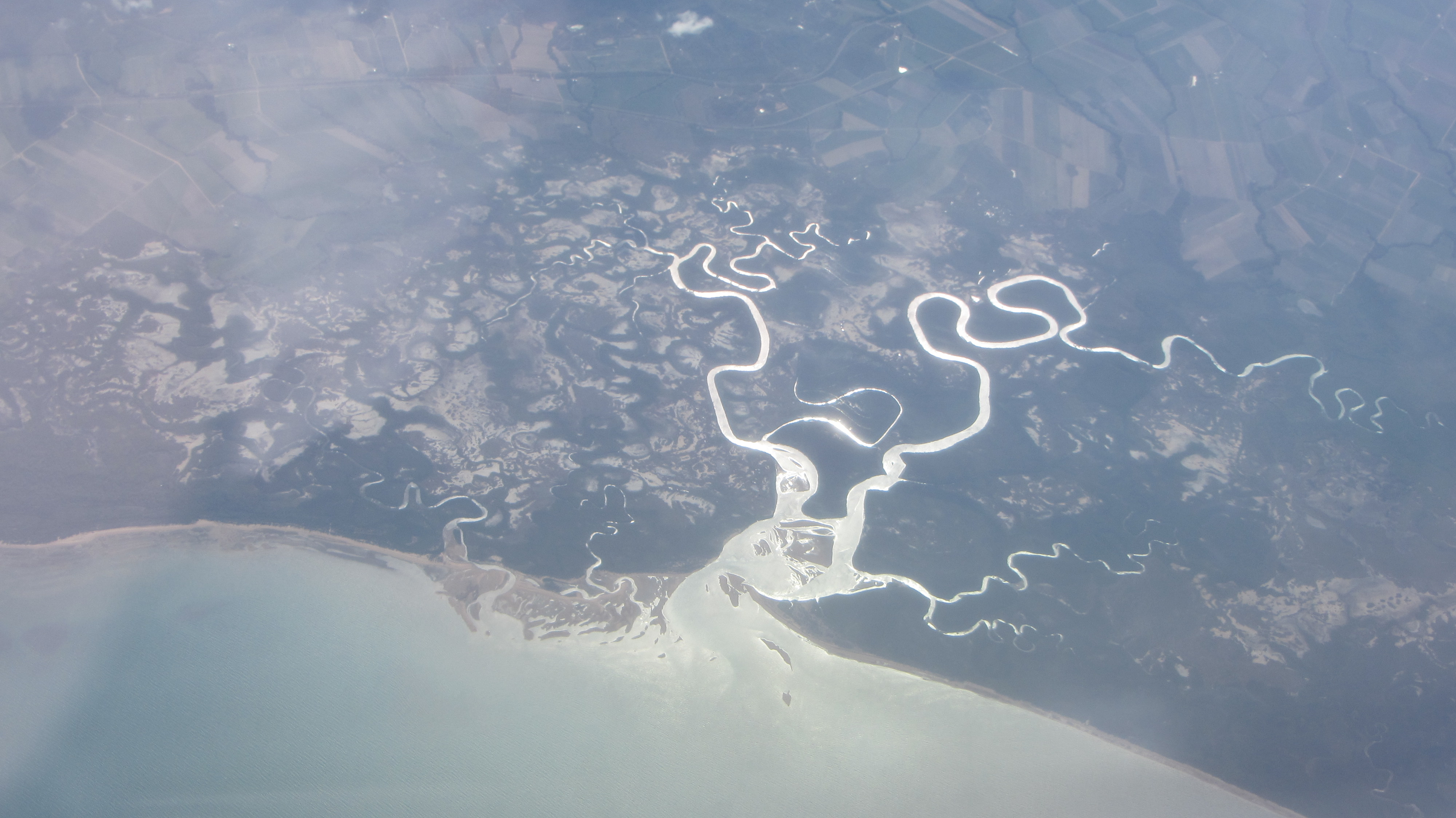
- Aerial view of Halifax Bay
- Interactive map of Halifax Bay
- Location: Queensland, Australia
- Coordinates: 18.820°S 146.3472082°E
- Part of: Coral Sea
- Ocean/sea sources: Pacific Ocean

Halifax Bay is a region located around a bay in the Coral Sea, situated on the Australian coast in North Queensland. It is bordered by the town of Ingham to the north, city of Townsville to the south and Great Palm Island off the coast to the east.

Regional localities include Mount Low, Bushland Beach, Yabulu, Saunders Beach, Toolakea Beach, Bluewater, Toomulla Beach, Rollingstone, Balgal Beach, Paluma, Mutamee, Taylors Beach and Allingham (formerly Forrest Beach).

Major tributaries of Halifax Bay to the north include Trebonne Creek, Cattle Creek, and Crystal Creek, while in the south the inflows are from Rollingstone Creek, Bluewater Creek, Black River and the Bohle River.

== History ==
Halifax Bay was originally inhabited by the Warakami and the Wulgurkaba aboriginal tribes and these were likely some of the tribes people that Captain James Cook saw when he named Halifax Bay between June 6–8, 1770. George Elphinstone Dalrymple explored the Halifax Bay area in the early 1860s and the first settlers to the Herbert River Valley settled soon after. Ingham was first settled in 1865. The southern parts of Halifax Bay developed at a slower pace with the area south of Crystal Creek being included in the newly formed Thuringowa Land Division in 1879.

The southern section of Halifax Bay, including Great Palm Island, was prominent in air defence of the area during the Second World War. Halifax Bay, being on the northern approaches to the major air base in Townsville, was an ideal signals and battery location. Significant operations included Fort Kissing Point at Cape Pallarenda in Townsville, a signal and radar station on Mount Spec in Thuringowa, a radio station at Mount Low also in Thuringowa and a seaplane base at the north end of Great Palm Island. A US Army Hospital operated at Black River in Thuringowa. Rattlesnake Island, also in Halifax Bay, was used for live firing (and is still used for this purpose).

After the war the southern section of Halifax Bay began a transition from rural to residential settlement with significant beach developments occurring from the 1960s onwards. In 1971 the area of southern Halifax Bay was heavily impacted by Cyclone Althea.

== Industry ==
In 1974 Thuringowa's Nickel Refinery (Queensland Nickel) began its operations at Yabulu on the south end of Halifax Bay. The refinery ceased operations in 2016.

The northern section of Halifax Bay is a major sugar producing area. The first settlers to the northern area were cattle farmers but sugar became the major interest when the Mackenzie Brothers built the first sugar cane mill in 1872. By 1970 over 2,000,000T of cane was being crushed in the district

== Ecology ==
Halifax Bay is an important Australian ecological area. The bay itself is part of the Great Barrier Reef World Heritage Area whilst the Paluma Range is included in the Wet Tropics World Heritage Area. Halifax Bay is generally a turbid environment that supports a wide variety of commercial and recreational fish species, prawns and scallops. The bay also supports Dugong habitats and is a significant Green Turtle nesting area. Operators and regulatory bodies regularly assess environmental impacts from sugar growers, the Yabulu Refinery, military use and residential use.

== See also ==
- Former City of Thuringowa
- Pandora Reef
