= Bluewater Beach, Queensland =

Bluewater Beach
- Town
- Interactive map of Bluewater Beach
- Coordinates: 19.1505°S 146.5988°E
- Country: Australia
- State: Queensland
- LGA: City of Townsville
- Location: 36.1 km (22.4 mi) NW of Townsville CBD; 1,393 km (866 mi) NNW of Brisbane

Government
  - State electorate: Thuringowa
  - Federal division: Herbert
- Time zone: UTC+10:00 (AEST)
- Postcode: 4818

Bluewater Beach is a beachside town within the locality of Bluewater in the City of Townsville, Queensland, Australia.

== History ==
Originally part of Jalloonda, the town was named on 17 March 1984.
