= Greenvale, Queensland =

Greenvale
- Town
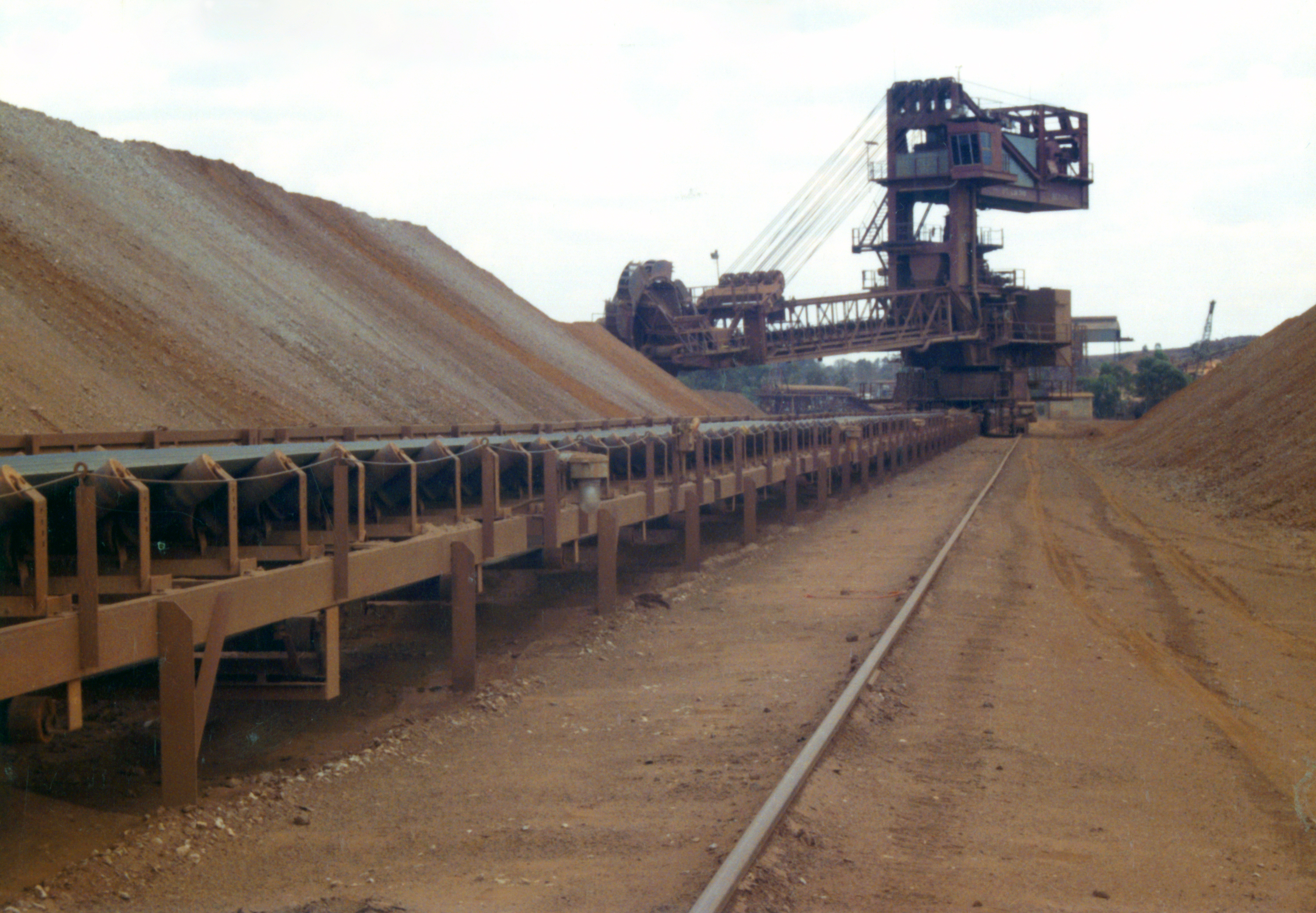
- Nickel mining at Greenvale, 1986

- Interactive map of Greenvale
- Coordinates: 19.0009°S 144.9800°E
- Country: Australia
- State: Queensland
- LGA: Charters Towers Region
- Location: 203 km (126 mi) WSW of Ingham; 205 km (127 mi) NW of Charters Towers; 248 km (154 mi) WNW of Townsville; 1,513 km (940 mi) NNW of Brisbane
- Established: 1973

Government
  - State electorate: Traeger
  - Federal division: Kennedy

Area
  - Total: 6,107.8 km^{2} (2,358.2 sq mi)

Population
  - Total: 192 (2021 census)
  - Density: 0.03144/km^{2} (0.08142/sq mi)
- Time zone: UTC+10:00 (AEST)
- Postcode: 4816
Localities around Greenvale
Mount Surprise	Minnamoolka	Valley Of Lagoons
Conjuboy	Greenvale	Valley Of Lagoons
Lyndhurst	Basalt	Basalt

Greenvale is a rural town and locality in the Charters Towers Region, Queensland, Australia. In the 2021 census, the locality of Greenvale had a population of 192 people.

== Geography ==
Greenvale is a nickel mining area, approximately 220 kilometres (137 mi) northwest of Townsville. Other metal ores are also extracted there.

Greenvale lies on the banks of the Burdekin River and on the Gregory Highway, which is a fully sealed road connecting the town to Charters Towers.

Greenvale railway line (an ore-carrying railway line) ran between Greenvale and Queensland Nickel Industries (QNI) processing plant at Yabulu, approximately 20 kilometres (12 mi) north of Townsville from 1974 to 1993. There are a number of abandoned railway stations on the line:

- Greenvale railway station (18.9739°S 144.9449°E)
- Miners Lake railway station (18.9789°S 144.9975°E)
- Pilkara railway station (19.0802°S 145.1866°E)
- Malan railway station (19.1896°S 145.4082°E)

There are a number of airstrips, including (from north to south):

- Craigs Pocket Airstrip (18.5656°S 145.0068°E)
- Marionvale Airstrip (18.5961°S 144.8969°E)
- Wyandotte Airstrip (18.7538°S 144.8397°E)
- Miners Lake Airstrip, east of the town on Aerodrome Road (18.9968°S 145.0140°E)

== History ==
Gugu Badhun (also known as Koko-Badun and Kokopatun) is an Australian Aboriginal language of North Queensland. The language region includes areas within the local government area of Charters Towers Region, particularly the localities of Greenvale and the Valley of Lagoons, and in the Upper Burdekin River area and in Abergowrie.

The town was named by the Queensland Place Names Board on 16 December 1972. The town takes its name from a pastoral run operated by John Langton in 1860s.

Greenvale Project No 2 State School opened on 22 May 1972 and closed on 18 October 1974. This is most likely to have been a school serving a construction camp.

Greenvale Project No 1 State School opened 18 February 1974. It closed on 29 March 1974.

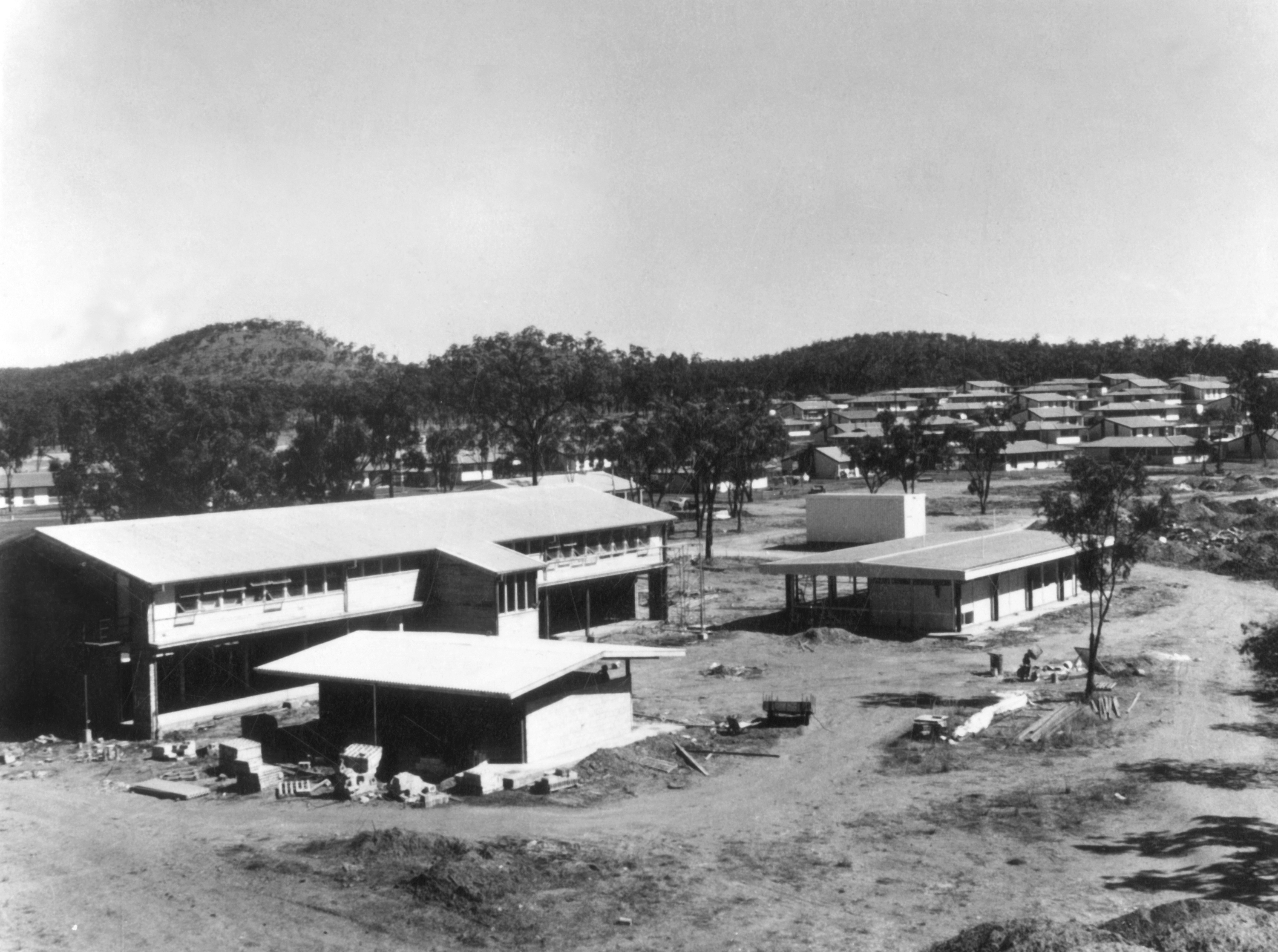
Greenvale State School, 1974

Greenvale State School opened on 18 September 1972.

Greenvale Post Office opened on 1 November 1973.

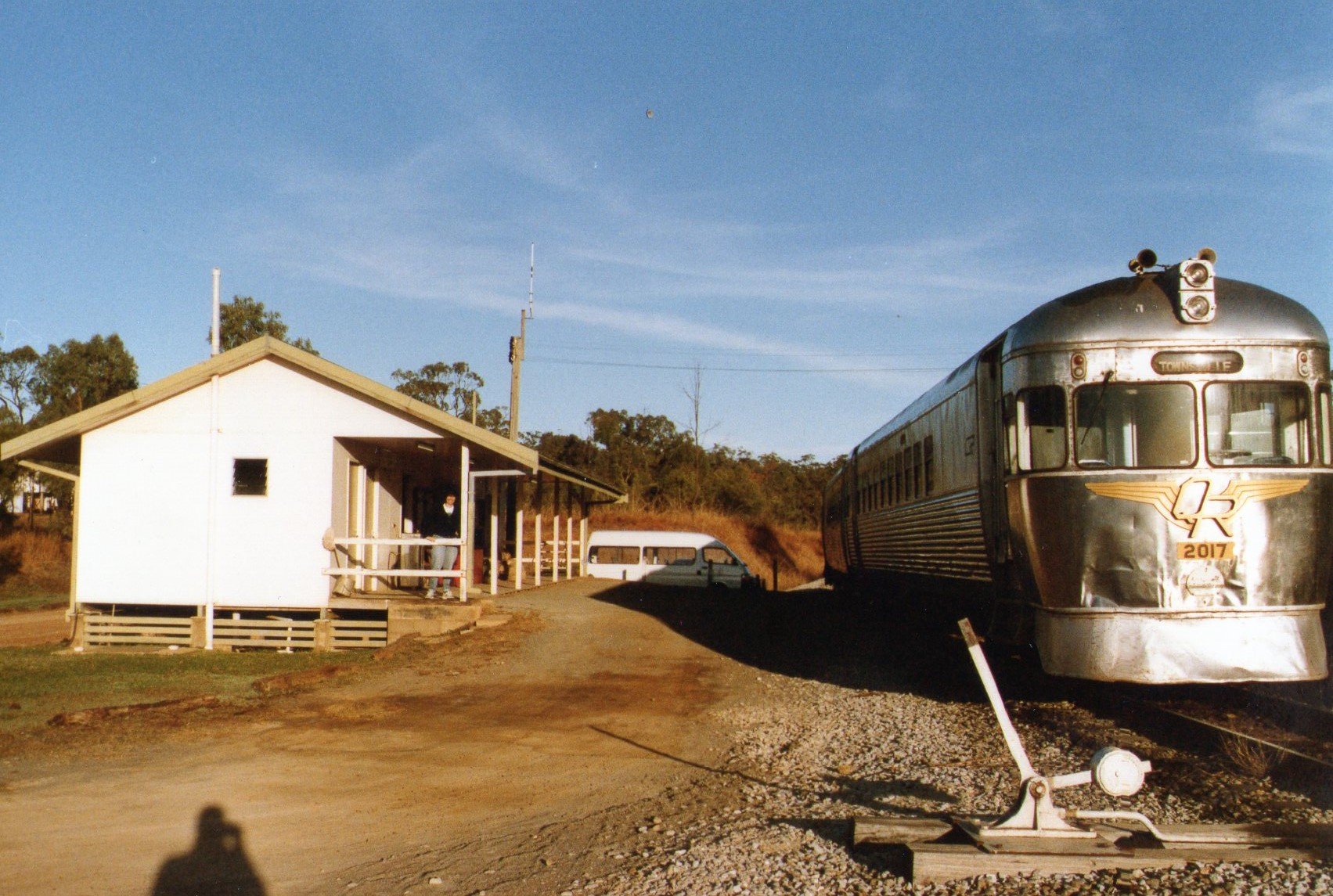
RM 2017 at Greenvale Station about to depart on the fortnightly service to Townsville, circa 1991

Some of the longest trains in Australia were pulled along the railway line. The railway line tracks were removed in mid-2000; however the bridges, cuttings, blue metal and easement remain. Occasionally people walk from Yabulu to Greenvale along it, as a form of fundraising.

Despite the fact that the mine itself has since concluded operations, more mining operations around the area have since commenced and homes are all fully occupied with workers supporting the regional mining and exploration.

When the nickel mine was in operation, its population was estimated to be 650 people.

In June 2023 at least three buildings in Greenvale were damaged by the sonic boom from a Royal Australian Air Force jet fight that flew at supersonic speeds over the town. It was reported in 2025 that other buildings had been damaged and the RAAF had not provided compensation.

== Demographics ==
In the 2006 census, the locality of Greenvale (then in the Shire of Dalrymple) had a population of 255 people.

In the 2016 census, the locality of Greenvale had a population of 232 people.

In the 2021 census, the locality of Greenvale had a population of 192 people.

== Economy ==
The Greenvale mining lease has undergone extensive exploration work by Straits Resources and Metallica Minerals for the purpose of reopening the nickel and cobalt operations. The surrounding areas have extensive nickel and cobalt mineralisation. During this most recent exploration work, the Lucknow ridge south of the mine has been found to contain one of the largest known reserves of scandium oxide in the Lateritic nickel ore deposits. According to the managing director of Metallica Minerals, Andrew Gillies, the deposit's quality and purity are remarkably high.

Scandium oxide is a critical component of solid oxide fuel cells which have promise for the efficient direct production of electricity from low carbon gas fuels.

== Education ==
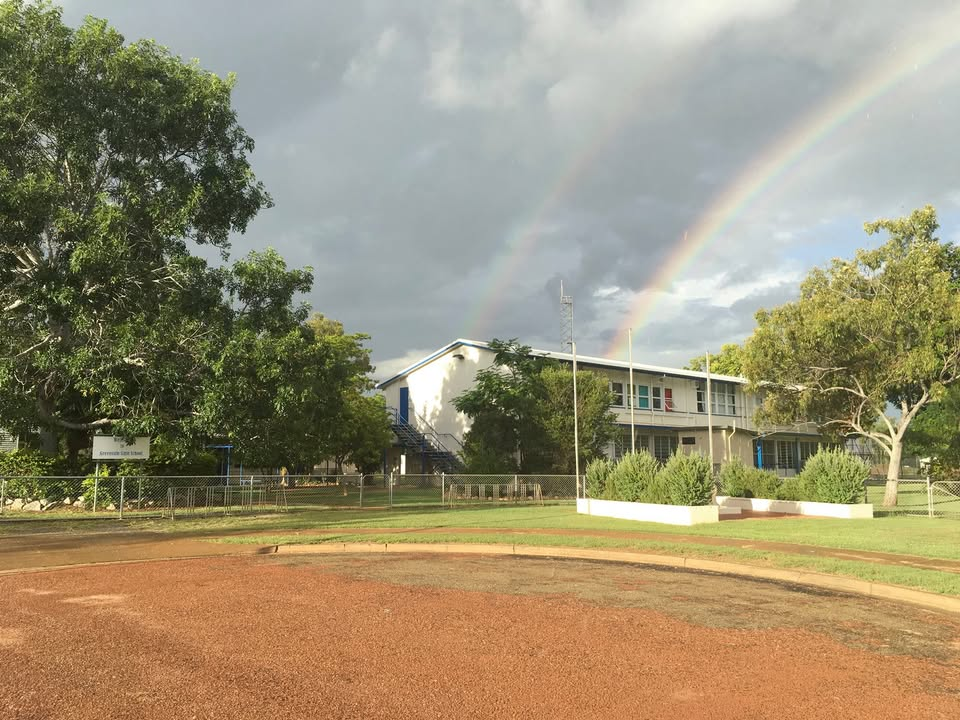
Greenvale State School, 2025

Greenvale State School is a government primary (Early Childhood to Year 6) school for boys and girls at Cassia Court (18.9991°S 144.9805°E). In 2017, the school had an enrolment of 31 students with 3 teachers and 8 non-teaching staff (4 full-time equivalent). In 2018, the school had an enrolment of 28 students with 4 teachers (3 full-time equivalent) and 8 non-teaching staff (4 full-time equivalent).

There are no secondary schools in Greenvale, nor nearby. The alternatives are distance education and boarding school.

== Attractions ==
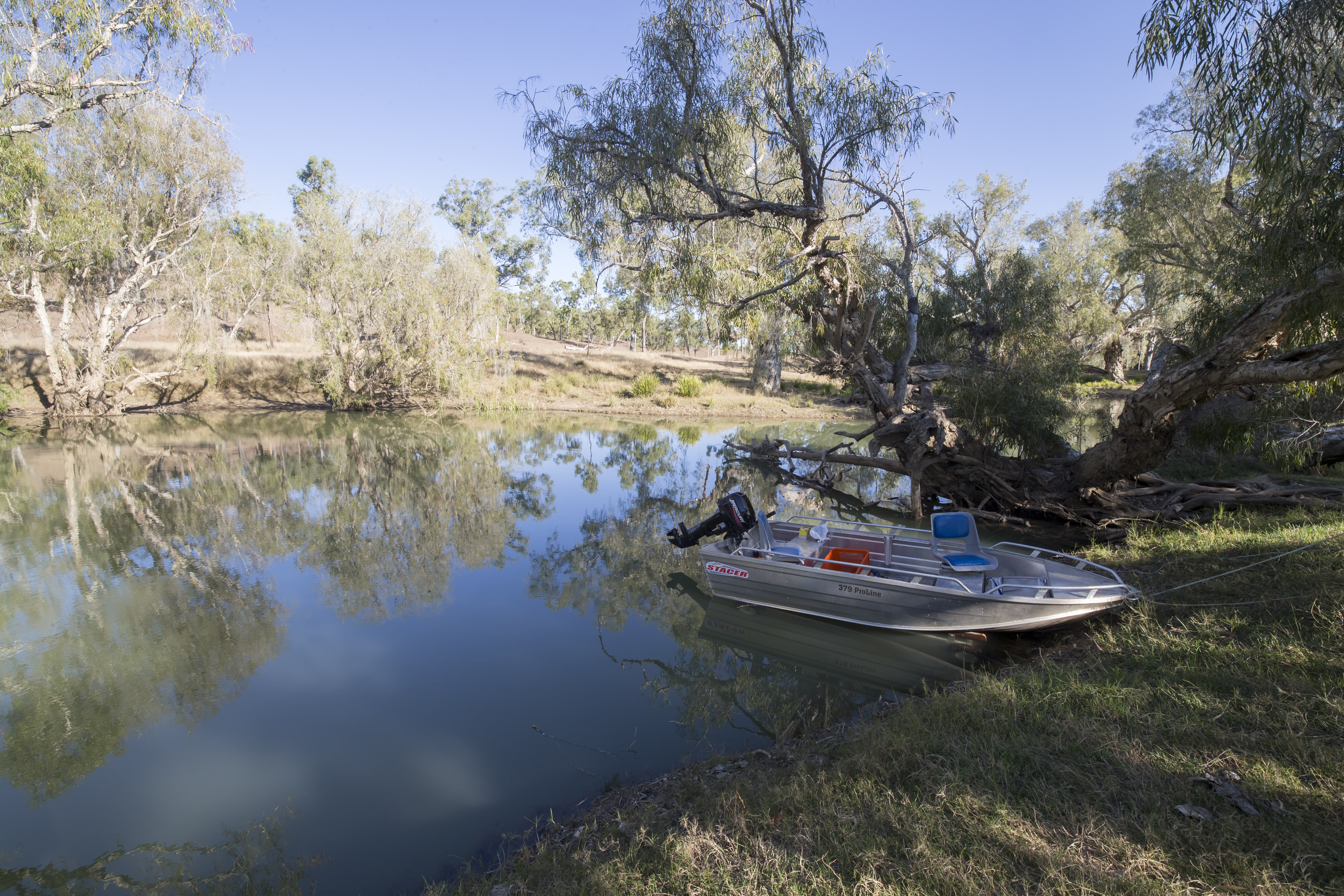
Reedy Brook, 2014

The Three Rivers Hotel, made famous by Slim Dusty in a song by the same name, is now located at Greenvale. This is not the actual hotel where the song was penned by Stan Coster. The hotel reference is actually to the "Mess Hall" at the construction camp where Stan Coster penned the song. Stan worked as Grader operator for Thiess Brothers on the construction of the railway line. The origin of the name "Three Rivers Hotel" is not because the "hotel" was ever at the junction of the three rivers - Burdekin, Star and Clarke as stated on numerous web sites. The lyrics mentions the camp at the Star River. This was one of 6 camps that existed on the length of the Greenvale line . During 1974 North Queensland was severely drenched by a very active wet season and work on the railway line ceased for days, even weeks, on end. The workers in the camps had nothing better to do than spend the day in the camp "boozer". Each camp had a boozer which was a basic demountable building with outdoor covered seating. During one of these wet days the water started to enter the confines of the boozer and immediately some of the men started digging some improvised drainage around the boozer to channel away the water. As they built the channels, some wags named them after the 3 main rivers (Burdekin, Star and Clarke). These were joined up roughly as they do in real life and the boozer named "the Three Rivers Hotel". One of the drinkers that day was Stan Coster who penned the song on the spot in the bar and performed it for the drinkers. The three rivers referred in the song do not join up at one point but the Star and the Clarke join the Burdekin at completely separate locations and therefore there could be no hotel on the "junction" of the three rivers the song refers to.

There is a 9-hole golf course, caravan park and general store/mini supermarket. The hotel serves meals and has a number of self-contained units once used by the mine to house staff and contractors.

Undara Volcanic National Park is approximately 130 kilometres (81 mi) to the north.
