= Bluewater Creek =

Stream in the US state of Missouri

Bluewater Creek is a stream in northern Butler and southern Wayne counties in the U.S. state of Missouri. It is a tributary of Asher Creek.

The stream headwaters arise in Butler County at 36°55′01″N 90°25′31″W about 2.5 miles northeast of Hendrickson. It flows generally east-northeast passing under Missouri Route W and enters Wayne County just prior to is confluence with Asher Creek within the waters of Lake Wappapello at 36°55′42″N 90°21′14″W.

Bluewater Creek was named for the blueish hue of its water.

== See also ==
- List of rivers of Missouri
