= Toolakea, Queensland =

Toolakea
- Town
- Interactive map of Toolakea
- Coordinates: 19.1452°S 146.5830°E
- Country: Australia
- State: Queensland
- City: Townsville
- LGA: City of Townsville
- Location: 21.8 km (13.5 mi) NW of Deeragun; 37.1 km (23.1 mi) NW of Townsville CBD; 1,372 km (853 mi) NNW of Brisbane

Government
  - State electorate: Hinchinbrook
  - Federal division: Herbert

Area
  - Total: 0.7 km^{2} (0.27 sq mi)

Population
  - Total: 218 (2021 census)
  - Density: 311/km^{2} (810/sq mi)
- Time zone: UTC+10:00 (AEST)
- Postcode: 4818
Localities around Toolakea
Coral Sea	Coral Sea	Coral Sea
Bluewater	Toolakea	Bluewater
Bluewater	Bluewater	Bluewater

Toolakea is a coastal town and suburb in the City of Townsville, Queensland, Australia. In the 2021 census, the suburb of Toolakea had a population of 218 people.

== Geography ==
Toolakea is to the north of Bluewater, approximately 33 kilometres (21 mi) north-east of the Townsville, Queensland, Australia.

The Toolakea community stretches approximately 2 kilometres (1.2 mi) along the Esplanade. Toolakea Beach (19.1444°S 146.5778°E) itself stretches approximately 8 kilometres (5.0 mi) from the mouth of Bluewater Creek to the mouth of Sleeper Log Creek.

== History ==
Toolakea is an Aboriginal word, possibly from Warakami language meaning sunny place.

== Demographics ==
In the 2006 census, the suburb of Toolakea had a population of 205 people.

In the 2016 census, the suburb of Toolakea had a population of 205 people, unchanged from 2006.

In the 2021 census, the suburb of Toolakea had a population of 218 people.

== Amenities ==
Facilities include a park with public toilets, barbecues, picnic tables and a children's playground.

== Education ==
There are no schools in Toolakea. The nearest government primary school is Bluewater State School in neighbouring Bluewater to the south-west. The nearest government secondary school is Northern Beaches State High School in Deeragun to the south-east.
