= Nadia: The Secret of Blue Water =

Japanese anime television series

- North American Blu-ray box cover, featuring Nadia (left) and Jean (right)
- ふしぎの海のナディア
- Genre: Adventure; Steampunk
- Created by: Hideaki Anno; Hayao Miyazaki (concept); Jules Verne (original works)
- Developed by: Hisao Ōkawa
- Directed by: Hideaki Anno (chief); Shinji Higuchi (23–39)
- Music by: Shirō Sagisu
- Country of origin: Japan
- Original language: Japanese
- No. of episodes: 39 (list of episodes)

Production
- Producers: Hiroshi Kubota; Kenichi Maruyama (1–26); Keiichirō Yoshida (27–39)
- Animators: Toho; Korad (Note: Animation assistance (アニメーション協力) for all episodes were provided by Group TAC, Gainax and Sei Young Animation.)
- Production company: NHK

Original release
- Network: NHK General TV
- Release: April 13, 1990 – April 12, 1991

Related
- Original video animation

The Nautilus Story
- Directed by: Hideaki Anno (chief); Shinji Higuchi
- Written by: Story: Hideaki Anno (uncredited); Hayao Miyazaki (uncredited); Composition: Naoto Hashimoto; Screenplay: Hisao Ōkawa; Yasuo Tanami (2–3); Hayao Miyazaki (uncredited)
- Music by: Shirō Sagisu
- Studio: Gainax; Group TAC; Sei Young Animation
- Released: June 21, 1991 – October 21, 1991
- Runtime: 90 minutes (1); 94 minutes (2); 94 minutes (3)
- Related
- The Motion Picture (1991)

Nadia: The Secret of Blue Water (Note: Also known by the title Nadia and the Secret of Blue Water) (ふしぎの海のナディア, Fushigi no Umi no Nadia; lit. 'Nadia of the Mysterious Seas') is a Japanese anime television series created by Hideaki Anno for NHK. Inspired by the works of Jules Verne, particularly Twenty Thousand Leagues Under the Seas and the exploits of Captain Nemo, the series follows former circus performer Nadia and young inventor Jean, who are led off to adventure by a secret in Nadia's pendant.

The original Japanese broadcast of the series aired from April 1990 to April 1991 for 39 episodes. Streamline Pictures released the first eight episodes in the United States on VHS from March 1992 to August 1993. The full series was distributed in the United States from 2001 to 2002 by ADV Films on DVD and VHS, with an American broadcast airing on ADV's Anime Network. Following the 2009 closure of ADV, Sentai Filmworks re-licensed the series and re-released it to Blu-ray and DVD in March 2014. GKIDS acquired the license in 2022 and released a new 4K restoration the same year.

== Plot ==
Set in an alternate universe in 1889, the series centers on Nadia, a 14-year-old girl of unknown origins, and Jean, a young, warm-hearted French inventor. Early in the story, the two protagonists are chased by Grandis Granva, Sanson, and Hanson, a group of jewel thieves who pursue Nadia for the blue jeweled pendant she possesses named the Blue Water. After being rescued by Captain Nemo and his submarine, the Nautilus, the jewel thieves and the young protagonists join forces and participate in the struggle against the Neo-Atlantean forces, who seek to dominate the world.

In the process, Nadia and Jean save the world from violent domination by the Neo-Atlantean forces led by Gargoyle, explore worldly mysteries and the powers of the Blue Water, uncover Nadia's hidden family ties, and ultimately discover Nadia's secret origins.

== Production ==
This series' origins date to the mid-1970s when Hayao Miyazaki was hired by Toho to develop a television series. One of these concepts was "Around the World in 80 days by Sea" (adapted from Jules Verne's 1870 novel Twenty Thousand Leagues Under the Seas), in which two orphan children pursued by villains team up with Captain Nemo and the Nautilus. It was never produced, but Toho retained the rights for the story outline, while Miyazaki reused elements from his original concept in later projects like Future Boy Conan and Castle in the Sky.

Gainax's initial involvement with the project occurred during an internal power struggle between then vice president Hiroaki Inoue and studio president Toshio Okada. During a pitch with NHK, Group TAC requested character designs and settings. Inoue, who was producer on Gunbuster, provided a pitch, bypassing Okada, using material created in secret by Yoshiyuki Sadamoto and Mahiro Maeda. After the conclusion of the pitch NHK chose to proceed with Inoue's Nadia presentation, though the estimated cost of producing the show would cause Gainax to lose money. After a meeting at NHK where senior Gainax staff led by Okada demanded Inoue be removed from the project or else they would withdraw, Inoue left the company. Sadamoto was originally assigned to be director but eventually dropped out, preferring to concentrate on design and animation. Hideaki Anno was chosen as his replacement. The series contains references and in-jokes to other anime works including Space Battleship Yamato, Macross and Time Bokan. Some episodes of the series were animated in Korea.

At the completion of the series, Gainax had lost ¥80 million on the project and had no rights to the series itself. However, they were allowed rights to produce a video game of the series, which would generate record earnings for the company. During production of the series, the company was also involved in other works to offset the losses; however, other issues arose surrounding those projects which highlighted several issues within the company. Group TAC later requested Gainax produce a Nadia movie and provided a ¥50 million advance. Hideaki Anno was convinced to direct it after initially declining the role due to the stress of making the series. Initial production work began and included character designs by Sadamoto. However, the company was unable to develop the project and withdrew. The original advance had brought Gainax's loss on the series down to ¥30 million, but the advance was spent on early production, leaving Gainax unable to repay it until after the success of Neon Genesis Evangelion, in which Gainax returned the advance to Group TAC, minus some costs from Gainax's involvement in providing designs and edited footage from the series.

Evangelion itself was originally planned as a further sequel to Nadia, regarding the 16 "Adams" who escaped from the destruction of the Red Noah and caused a cataclysmic event known as The Dead Sea Evaporation Incident (死海蒸発事件, Shikai Jōhatsu Jiken), but the scripts for all 26 planned episodes had to be completely rewritten when Gainax could not secure the rights to Nadia from NHK.

== Media ==
=== Anime ===
The series was broadcast on NHK General TV between April 13, 1990, and April 12, 1991, and consisted of 39 episodes. It was released in Japan on ten VHS volumes by NHK Video and Bandai Visual between April 26 and November 29, 1991. Two Laserdisc box sets were released on December 21, 1992, and April 21, 1993. Ten individual discs were released between November 25, 1994, and March 24, 1995. Nadia was released on ten DVD discs by King Records and Sogo Vision between August 29 and December 29, 2001. A limited edition DVD box set was released on October 30, 2001, with the regular edition released in two box sets on June 1 and October 1, 2007. Ten individual discs were released between April 23 and May 21, 2008. A Blu-ray box set consisting of seven discs was released in Japan on November 23, 2011. Nadia: The Secret of Blue Water – Nautilus Story, a compilation director's cut by Hideaki Anno, was released in Japan on six VHS tapes and three Laserdiscs from June 21 to October 21, 1991.

Streamline Pictures licensed the series for North America and produced an English dub of the first eight episodes, which were released on individual tapes as Nadia between March 1992 and August 1993. Streamline co-founder Carl Macek pitched the episodes for a television broadcast, intending to use the network money to dub the rest of the series, but was unsuccessful. Orion Home Video later distributed the episodes on two VHS tapes in January 1996 as The Secret of Blue Water, each of which contained four episodes. Compilations for the remaining episodes were planned by Streamline, but Orion declined to have them produced.

In June 1999, ADV Films announced they had licensed the series for North America. It was announced in February 2000 that the series would be released on the new ADV Fansubs range of subtitled releases intended for direct sales via mail order and at conventions. The series was later released on ten DVDs and VHS between June 19, 2001, and July 16, 2002. The DVDs were later collected into two box sets, released on May 18 and July 6, 2004. Sentai Filmworks announced that they will release the series through digital outlets as well as on DVD and Blu-ray in 2014. The Blu-ray was released March 4, 2014. The series was released in the UK on DVD and Blu-ray by Animatsu Entertainment on June 22, 2015.

A Nadia feature film sequel premiered in Japanese theaters in 1991. The events take place three years after the defeat of Gargoyle and Neo-Atlantis. It was released as Nadia: The Motion Picture on DVD in August 2002 by ADV Films.

=== Manga ===
In 1992 a manga adaptation of the series was released under the name The Secret of Blue Water Comic. Although the characters from the series appear in the manga, the stories are not related to the original story and are typically of a comedic nature.

=== Music ===
Since the series' first airing in 1990, Toshiba EMI's anime music label, Futureland, released several CDs containing the music of the series; of note are three initial volumes of music, as well as an extended compilation, Hooked on Nadia, which contained more cues than the three original CDs.

ADV Films released the three CD soundtracks of the series (the first time they were issued in North America) and a CD of the movie soundtrack in North America on November 25, 2003.

On August 27, 2012, Starchild released a complete box set of music from the series. The set consists of 11 CDs and a DVD-ROM.

=== Film ===
Nadia: The Secret of Blue Water – The Motion Picture

Japanese name
- Kanji: ふしぎの海のナディア
Transcriptions
- Revised Hepburn: Fushigi no Umi no Nadia
- Directed by: Masaru Aono
- Written by: Yasuo Tanami; Shigeru Morikawa
- Produced by: Hideki Higuchi
- Starring: Yoshino Takamori; Noriko Hidaka; Kumiko Takizawa; Ken'yû Horiuchi
- Cinematography: Dong Seop Choi
- Edited by: Masashi Furukawa
- Music by: Shirô Sagisu
- Production company: Group TAC
- Distributed by: Toho
- Release date: June 29, 1991
- Running time: 85 minutes
- Country: Japan
- Language: Japanese
- Budget: ¥50 million

Nadia: The Secret of Blue Water – The Motion Picture, (Note: Japanese: ふしぎの海のナディア, Hepburn: Fushigi no Umi no Nadia) also known as The Secret of Fuzzy, is a 1991 Japanese animated fantasy adventure film written by Yasuo Tanami (as Kaoru Umeno) and Shigeru Morikawa and directed by Masaru Aono. It was produced by Hideki Higuchi, animated by Group TAC, and distributed by Toho. The film stars the voices of Yoshino Takamori, Noriko Hidaka, Kumiko Takizawa, Ken'yû Horiuchi. The film was released in Toho theaters on June 29, 1991, alongside the live-action film adaptation of Video Girl Ai.

It depicts events three years after the ending of the TV series. Only Nadia, Jean, Grandis, Sanson, and Hanson return from the TV version. Marie, King, Ayrton, Electra, and the Nautilus crew appear only in Nadia's flashbacks. These flashbacks occupy about 30 minutes at the beginning and reuse footage from the TV series. The child of Captain Nemo and Electra, revealed in the final episode of the TV series, does not appear.

Originally, Gainax was supposed to produce the film, but director Hideaki Anno declined, saying he was "burned out" from the TV series. After producing only the plot and character designs, Gainax ran out of budget and could not complete the film. The remainder was finished by Group TAC. Gainax's contribution was limited to the plot, design work, and editing of the TV recap footage used in the film. According to Gainax co-founder Yasuhiro Takeda, about 50 million yen owed to Group TAC was only repaid after the success of Neon Genesis Evangelion.

==== Plot ====
Three years after the battle with Neo-Atlantis, Nadia works as a trainee journalist for The Planet Times in London, though her editor still treats her as a mere tea-serving assistant. Around this time, a series of bizarre incidents occur worldwide: in front of witnesses, prominent figures in government and the military suddenly emit smoke and vaporize, leaving only their clothes behind.

Nadia has become a reporter for The Planet Times newspaper while Jean returns to his house in Le Havre where a girl ends up ashore. He picks her up and tends to her. She slowly recovers her memory and realizes her name is Fuzzy but the real Fuzzy is dead and she is a clone. Nadia does some research on the government and military leaders turning into dust and suggests someone named Dr. Albert Whola is behind it. Nadia gets captured by Gieger, the leader of the Neo-Atlantis remnant.

Grandis, Hanson and Sanson capture Fuzzy and take her to Gieger's men near the harbour. Jean tries to rescue Fuzzy on a motorcycle but the two end up captured and thrown into the same cell as Nadia. All three are revealed to be in a submarine headed to Gieger's hideout. Gieger reveals that he intends to start a world war by capturing various world leaders and politicians and making their militaries attack each other.

Gieger forces Jean to walk a plank and he is nearly thrown overboard before Grandis, Hanson and Sanson arrive and attack the submarine one a boat. Jean and Nadia jump off the boat after the latter is show by one of Gieger's men and they are rescued from a shark by Sanson. Gieger returns to his lair where he prepares for the war. Whola reveals to Fuzzy that she is a clone of the original Fuzzy, his late daughter. Whola reveals his disdain for her as Gieger threatens Whola if his experiments on synthetic humans aren't perfected.

Grandis's boat is sunk by a cannon from Gieger's base but Nadia and Jean use a boat to make it to Gieger's island. Nadia and Jean sneak in but are discovered and run into Whola. Gieger arrives and tries to kill Whola for his incompetence along with the others. Fuzzy is shot by Gieger after she tries to protect Whola. Whola causes a fire and they escape. Gieger attempts to complete the robot clones by stealing life energy before Whola arrives and activates the self destruct sequence.

Nadia, Jean, Hanson, Sanson and Grandis escape without taking the brains of the world leaders trapped in jars. The artificial humans placed around the world dissolve into liquid. Gieger attempts to follow the submarine Grandis and the others stole and fires a rocket at them but he himself is crushed by a falling rock in the tunnel. Fuzzy dissolves into sparkles and is mourned by the others on the submarine. Jean and Nadia stand over Fuzzy's memorial placed on a cliffside. Nadia reveals she'll go back to London while Jean will continue inventing before they share a kiss.

==== Voice cast ====
Character name		Voice actor	
English	Japanese	Japanese (1991)	English (ADV Films 2002)
Nadia La Arwall	Nadia Ra Aruwōru (ナディア・ラ・アルウォール)	Yoshino Takamori	Meg Bauman
Jean Rocque Raltique	Jan Rokku Rarutīgu (ジャン・ロック・ラルティーグ)	Noriko Hidaka	Nathan Parsons
Grandis Granva	Gurandisu Guranbā (グランディス・グランバァ)	Kumiko Takizawa	Sarah Richardson
Sanson	Sanson (サンソン)	Kazuhiko Inoue	Martin Blacker
Hanson	Hanson (ハンソン)	Toshiharu Sakurai	Corey M. Gagne
Film original characters
Fuzzy	Fajii (ファジィ)	Tsukasa Itō	Lauren Worsham
Dr. Albert Wöhler	Aruberuto Ūrā-hakase (アルベルト・ウーラー博士)	Tamio Ōki	Unknown
Gieger	Gīgā (ギーガー)	Chikao Ōtsuka	Grant James
Fly	Furai (フライ)	Shūichi Ikeda	Unknown

The voice actors of the editor-in-chief of The Planet Times as well as numerous military and political figures are not credited.

==== Music ====
Nadia: The Secret of Blue Water — The Motion Picture (Original Soundtrack)

Soundtrack album by Shirō Sagisu
- Released: 1991-07-26
- Genre: Soundtrack
- Length: 51:57
- Label: FUTURELAND (TYCY-5172)
- Producers: Kiya Ōishi; Junji Fujita

Shirō Sagisu chronology
Nadia Original Soundtrack III (1991)	Nadia: The Secret of Blue Water — The Motion Picture (Original Soundtrack) (1991)	Nadia Vocal Collection (1992)

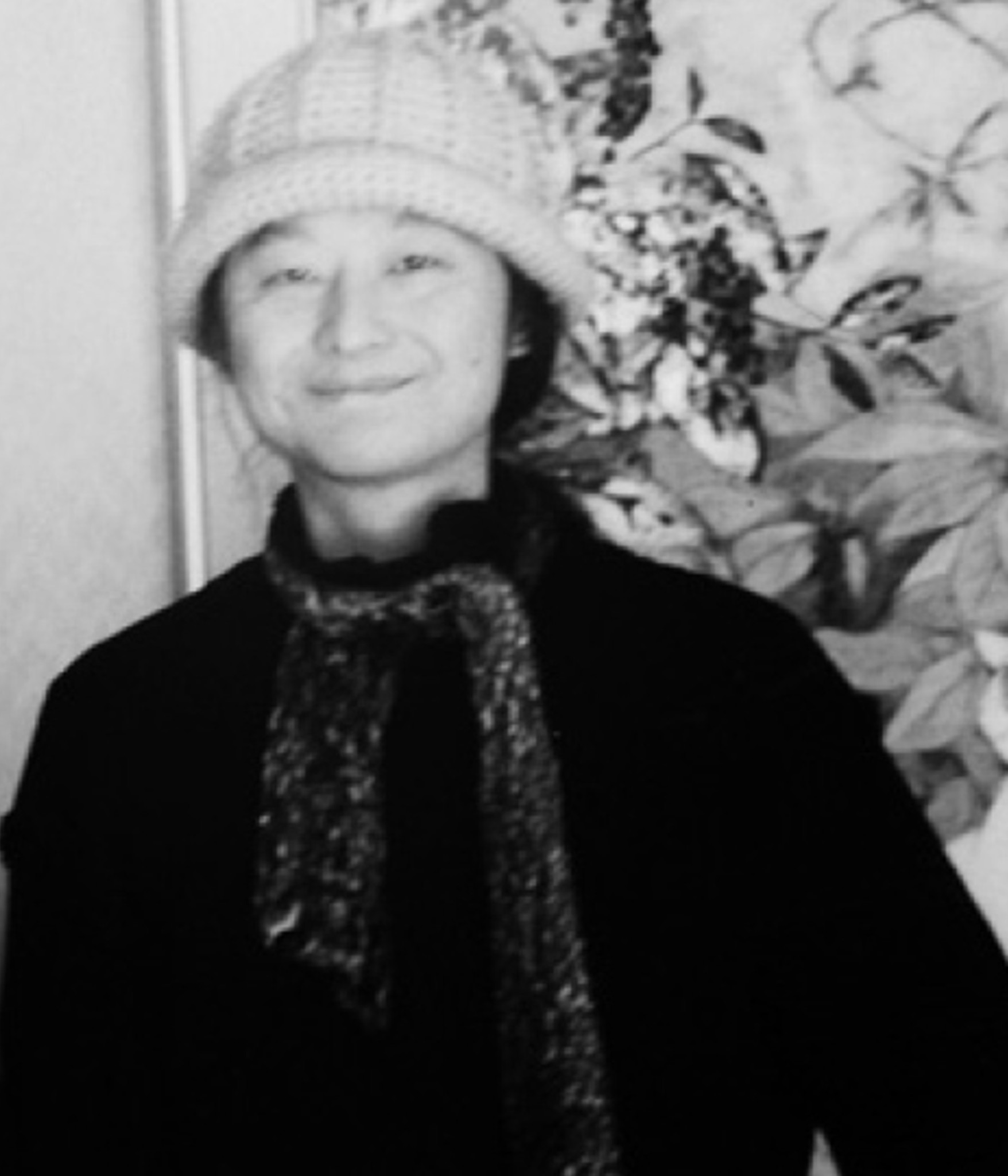
Shirō Sagisu (pictured in 2004), the composer

As with the series, Shirō Sagisu composed the score for the motion picture.

==== Reception ====
===== Critical response =====
The film has generally received negatively. On the review aggregator website Rotten Tomatoes, the film holds an audience approval rate of 25% from 2 reviews. The IMDB film score averages to 4.2/10 based on 243 reviews. Reviews cite the low quality animation of the film as well as the fact that a third of the runtime is recycled footage from the series displayed as memoires from Nadia along with the fact that the writing of the characters is inconsistent with their portrayals in the series like the Grandis Gang being hostile towards Jean when they weren't in the series.

==== Novelization ====
A novelization written by Hirotoshi Kobayashi called Nadia the movie: Fairy from the Sea was released on June 1, 1991.

=== Video games ===
The first Nadia video game was released in 1991 for the Family Computer console. The player controls a cast of characters in a simplistic strategy battle game. Battles are carried out through an RPG style turn-based system. Since the first game's release, six additional games were made. These games include: Fushigi no Umi no Nadia (March 19, 1991, published by Namco), Fushigi no Umi Nadia: The Secret of the Blue Water (March 27, 1992, developed and published by Gainax), Fushigi no Umi Nadia: The Secret of the Blue Water (October 23, 1992, developed and published by Gainax), Fushigi no Umi Nadia: The Secret of the Blue Water (FM Towns), Fushigi no Umi Nadia: The Secret of Blue Water (January 29, 1993, published by Hudson Soft), and Fushigi no Umi no Nadia: Inherit the Blue Water (September 22, 2005, published by Jinx).

Nadia: The Secret of Blue Water made its first Super Robot Wars appearance in Super Robot Wars X (released on March 29, 2018, in Japan, and on April 26 in Southeast Asia (Singapore, Malaysia, Thailand, the Philippines, and Indonesia), published by Bandai Namco).

== Reception ==
The series won a number of awards in the Animage Anime Grand Prix of 1991 including "Best Work". The opening theme Blue Water was voted as best song, while Jean, Sanson and Nemo were respectively voted as fourth, fifth and thirteenth best male character. Six episodes were voted into the top 20 best episodes, including episode 22 which was voted as best episode overall. Nadia herself was voted as best female character, and was also the first character to overtake Nausicaä as the favorite female anime character in Animage's readers poll. In 2001, the series placed 72 in a list of top 100 anime productions decided by Animage.

In The Anime Encyclopedia, Jonathan Clements and Helen McCarthy noted the series made an obvious attempt to reach the mass audience adding that "Very rarely has this approach produced a show of such enduring charm and emotional validity". They recognize that the audience is aware of a "dark and terrible fate" hiding behind the otherwise positive nature of the show's visuals and music. The series is compared to Gainax's later Neon Genesis Evangelion, which made the "lurking darkness" a central theme.

=== Atlantis controversy ===
When Disney's Atlantis: The Lost Empire was released in 2001, some viewers noticed that it bore a number of similarities to Nadia, particularly in its character design, setting, and story. The similarities, as noted by viewers in both Japan and America, were strong enough for its production company Gainax to be called to sue for plagiarism. According to Gainax member Yasuhiro Takeda, they only refrained from doing so because the decision belonged to parent companies NHK and Toho. Another Gainax worker, Hiroyuki Yamaga, was quoted in an interview in 2000 as: "We actually tried to get NHK to pick a fight with Disney, but even the National Television Network of Japan didn't dare to mess with Disney and their lawyers. [...] We actually did say that but we wouldn't actually take them to court. We would be so terrified about what they would do to them in return that we wouldn't dare."

Although Disney never responded formally to those claims, co-director Kirk Wise posted on a Disney animation newsgroup in May 2001, "Never heard of Nadia till it was mentioned in this [newsgroup]. Long after we'd finished production, I might add." He claimed both Atlantis and Nadia were inspired, in part, by the 1870 Jules Verne novel Twenty Thousand Leagues Under the Seas. However, speaking about the clarification, Lee Zion from Anime News Network wrote, "There are too many similarities not connected with 20,000 Leagues for the whole thing to be coincidence." As such, the whole affair ultimately entered popular culture as a convincing case of plagiarism.

== See also ==
- Atlantis in popular culture
- List of underwater science fiction works
