= Nadia: The Secret of Blue Water (video game) =

1991 video game

- Famicom cover art
- Developer: List: Advance Communication Company (FC) Namco (SMD) Gainax (PC-98, X68K, FMT) Hudson Soft (PCE SCD-ROM²)
- Publisher: List: Toho (FC) Namco (SMD) Gainax (PC-98, X68K, FMT) Hudson Soft (PCE SCD-ROM²)
- Director: Akinobu Hoshi
- Producer: Yukio Kotaki
- Designer: Tsutomu Nagai
- Programmer: Toru Nakagawa
- Artists: Hidenori Kimura; Hiroaki Hasegawa; Masako Tazaki; Naoki Iwai
- Composers: Masaaki Harada; Michiharu Hasuya
- Platforms: Family Computer, Sega Mega Drive, NEC PC-9801, X68000, PC Engine Super CD-ROM², FM Towns
- Release: 1991: Family Computer; JP: March 15, 1991 Mega Drive; JP: March 19, 1991 PC-9801; JP: March 27, 1992 X68000; JP: October 23, 1992 PC Engine Super CD-ROM²; JP: January 29, 1993 FM Towns; JP: February 1993
- Genre: Various
- Mode: Single-player

Nadia: The Secret of Blue Water (ふしぎの海のナディア, Fushigi no Umi no Nadia) is a Japan-exclusive multiplatform video game released from 1991 to 1993. It is based on the anime series Nadia: The Secret of Blue Water.

== Versions ==
=== Family Computer ===
Fushigi no Umi no Nadia (translated: Nadia of the Mysterious Seas) was released in 1991 by Toho for the Famicom console, based on the characters from the NHK animated TV series of the same name.

The player controls a cast of characters in a simple-looking battle strategy game. Battles are carried out through an RPG-style turn-based system.

This version of the game was poorly received due to its lack of originality and flawed gameplay.

=== Sega Mega Drive ===
This version was developed and published by Namco. While it is viewed from a top-down perspective, it is similar to a point-and-click adventure game. The player must talk to people and collect items to solve puzzles and advance through the game, but there are no combat elements to the game. There is a password feature that allows the player to resume from the beginning of each chapter. This version was released on March 19, 1991.

The plot of the game mostly follows the plotline of the original, but it diverges from the storyline in many ways. The introductions of Marie, Gargoyle, Emperor Neo, and the climactic moments, for instance, are drastically different from the show.

=== Sharp X68000 ===
Fushigi no Umi Nadia: The Secret of the Blue Water (Sharp X68000, October 23, 1992, developed and published by Gainax). This is a first person adventure game, and is the same game that was also released for the PC-9801 and FM Towns.

=== NEC PC-9801 ===
This version is an adventure game that begins inside the universal submarine known as Nautilus. Many still images are used, and it is notable for its high quality writing due to the frequent use of kanji.

=== FM Towns ===
Similar to the NEC 9801 version, this is an adventure game that begins inside the Universal submarine known as the Nautilus. This version features full voice acting.

=== PC Engine CD ===
This version was published and developed by Hudson Soft and was released in 1993.

This version is set on a deserted island with the theme of the battle between Captain Nemo and Gargoyles. Utilizing the performance of the PC Engine CD, and much like the NEC PC-9801 version, it has full voice acting and it also boasts anime-style visuals.
