= Bluewater Branch =

Stream in Hickman County, Tennessee, U.S.

Coordinates: 35.7709003°N 87.5994625°W

Bluewater Branch is a stream in Hickman County, Tennessee, in the United States. It is a tributary to Beaverdam Creek.

Bluewater Branch was so named for the clear waters it contained before the surrounding fields were plowed.

== See also ==
- List of rivers of Tennessee
