= Saunders Beach, Queensland =

Saunders Beach Townsville, Queensland
- Coordinates: 19.1569°S 146.6072°E
- Population: 385 (2021 census)
  - Density: 137.5/km^{2} (356/sq mi)
- Postcode(s): 4818
- Area: 2.8 km^{2} (1.1 sq mi)
- Time zone: AEST (UTC+10:00)
- Location: 17.2 km (11 mi) NW of Deeragun; 32.8 km (20 mi) NW of Townsville CBD; 1,488 km (925 mi) NNW of Brisbane
- LGA(s): City of Townsville
- State electorate(s): Townsville
- Federal division(s): Herbert
Localities around Saunders Beach:
Bluewater	Bluewater	Coral Sea
Bluewater	Saunders Beach	Yabulu
Yabulu	Yabulu	Yabulu

Saunders Beach is a coastal town and suburb of Townsville in the City of Townsville, Queensland, Australia. In the 2021 census, the suburb of Saunders Beach had a population of 385 people.

== Geography ==
Saunders Beach is 32.8 kilometres (20.4 mi) by road north-west of the Townsville CBD.

The suburb is bounded to the north and east by the Coral Sea and to the west by Althaus Creek It is bounded to the west by Althaus Creek (19.15250°S 146.60167°E).

The town is situated just south-east of the mouth of Althaus Creek. The beach Saunders Beach (19.1671°S 146.6227°E) itself extending from Althaus Creek along the coastline of the suburb and neighbouring Yabulu to the mouth of Black River, a total distance of approximately 5.6 kilometres (3.5 mi).

== History ==
Saunders Beach was originally part of the Parish of Jalloonda, but was established as separate locality on 17 March 1984. Its status was changed to be a suburb on 28 February 2003.

In 2004 a Beach Management Plan was put into place by Thuringowa City Council, to establish causes of erosion and help manage any future detriment to the beach by means of both natural and unnatural erosion.

In September 2021, a 3.8-metre (12 ft) crocodile was captured in Althaus Creek having been seen hanging around the boat ramps and pontoons. Wildlife officers believed that fish scraps improperly discarded by fishermen had attracted the crocodile and urged people to correctly dispose of such material in bins or taking it away.

== Demographics ==
In the 2006 census, the suburb of Saunders Beach had a population of 407 people. 48.2% of the Saunders Beach population were in the 25-54 age bracket with 14.7% of the population aged between 55-64.

In the 2016 census, the suburb of Saunders Beach had a population of 409 people.

In the 2021 census, the suburb of Saunders Beach had a population of 385 people.

== Education ==
There are no schools in Saunders Beach. The nearest government primary school is Bluewater State School in neighbouring Bluewater to the west. The nearest government secondary school is Northern Beaches State High School in Deeragun to the south-west.

== Amenities ==
Saunders Beach Community Centre is on the western corner of Saunders Beach Road and Atoll Street (19.1582°S 146.6027°E). Saunders Beach Rural Fire Station is at the community centre (19.1583°S 146.6027°E). The Townsville City Council operate a mobile library service which visits the community centre every second Wednesday afternoon.

There are two boat ramps in the suburb, both managed by the Townsville City Council, at:

- Boat Ramp Road, on the south bank of Althaus Creek (19.1570°S 146.5993°E)
- Purono Parkway, also on the south bank of the creek but further upstream (19.1625°S 146.5973°E)

== Attractions ==
Saunders Beach is a popular local tourist destination, the northern end of which offers free, limited camping reserves. Access to Althaus Creek is provided by means of a boat ramp, and other community facilities include a community centre, and numerous parks with children's playground equipment.
