= Rattlesnake Island (Queensland) =

Island in the Halifax Bay, northern Queensland, Australia

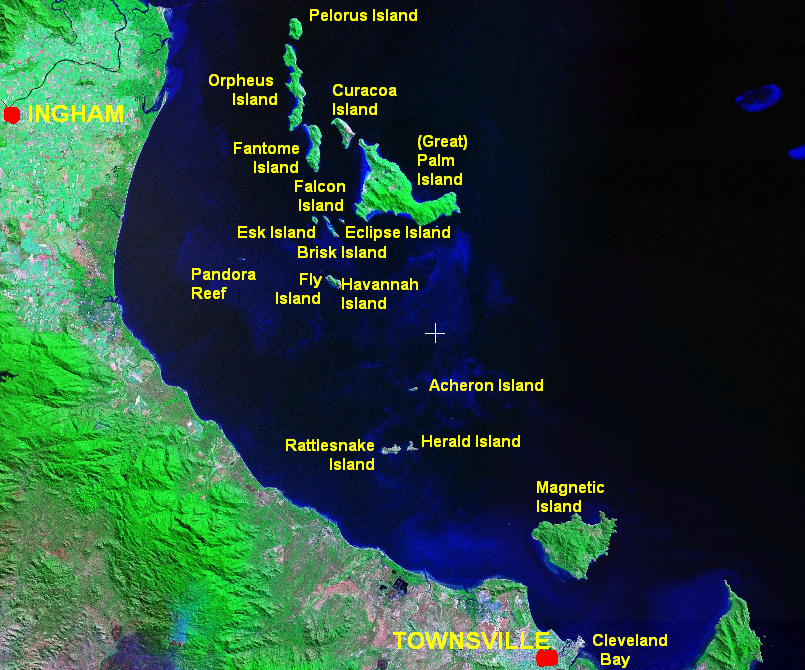
- Rattlesnake Island and surrounds
- Interactive map of Rattlesnake Island

Geography
- Location: Halifax Bay
- Coordinates: 19°01′59″S 146°36′36″E

Administration
- Australia

Rattlesnake Island is one of the islands South of the Great Palm Island group, northwest of Magnetic Island and directly east of Rollingstone in the Halifax Bay, northern Queensland, Australia.

RAAF Base Townsville (No. 323 Combat Support Squadron RAAF) conducts live firing with military aircraft on regular occasions. When the RAAF are not live firing, they also conduct survival courses on the island.

A hermit reportedly lived on the island for a number of years.

The island is named to commemorate the work of the survey ship HMS Rattlesnake from 1847 to 1850. During that survey work, the natural historian Thomas Henry Huxley made many significant advances in marine biology.

== September 1943 B-25 Mitchell crash ==
On 23 September 1943, a B-25 Mitchell bomber crashed 3 miles off the island, while undergoing a live firing test.

== See also ==
- List of islands of Queensland
- Thomas_Henry_Huxley#Voyage_of_the_Rattlesnake
