= Bluewater, Queensland =

Bluewater
- Town
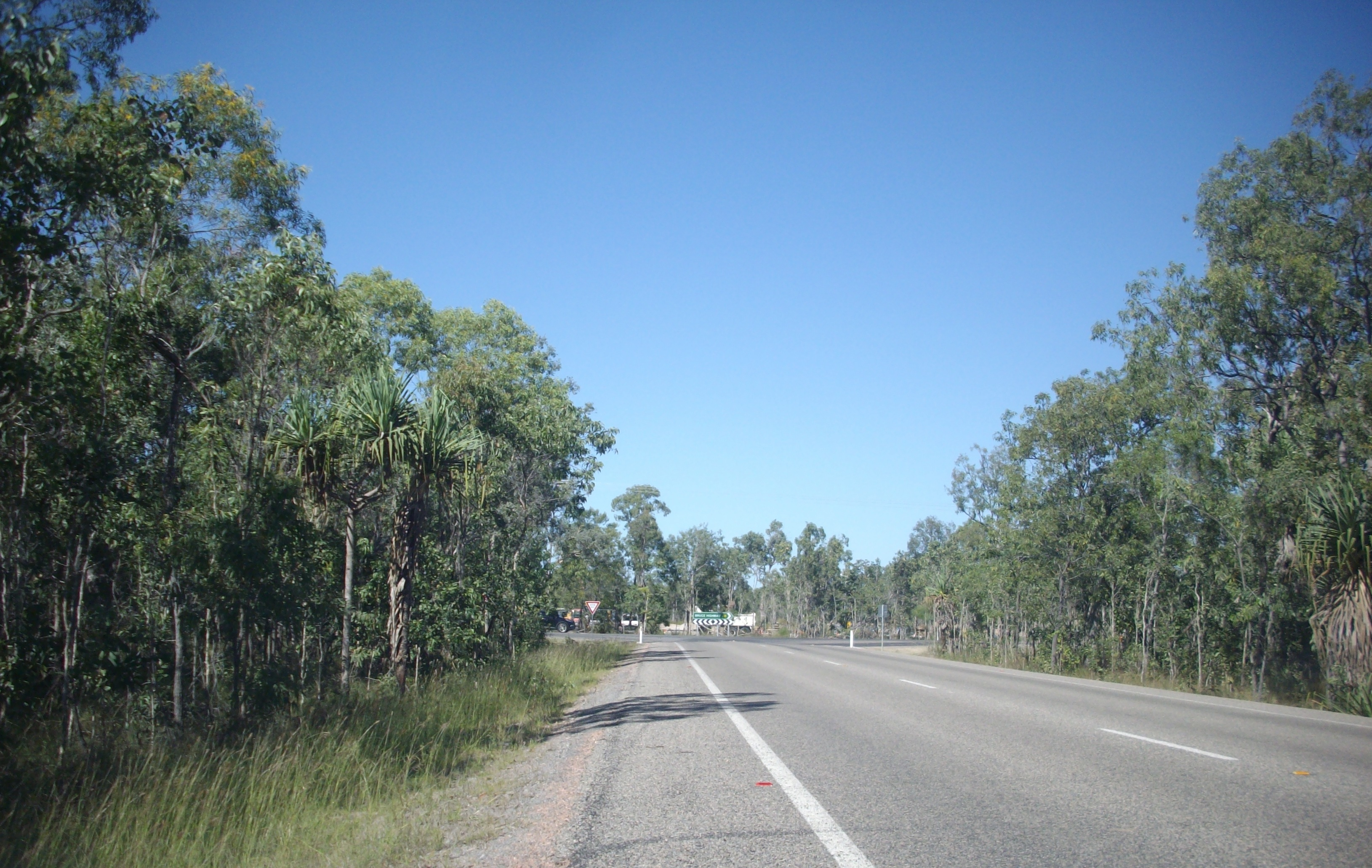
- Ditton Street with Bluewater Drive in the background

- Interactive map of Bluewater
- Coordinates: 19.1769°S 146.5558°E
- Country: Australia
- State: Queensland
- City: Townsville
- LGA: City of Townsville
- Location: 16.9 km (10.5 mi) NW of Deeragun; 32.8 km (20.4 mi) WNW of Townsville CBD; 1,363 km (847 mi) NNW of Brisbane

Government
  - State electorate: Thuringowa
  - Federal division: Herbert

Area
  - Total: 87.3 km^{2} (33.7 sq mi)

Population
  - Total: 1,085 (2021 census)
  - Density: 12.428/km^{2} (32.19/sq mi)
- Time zone: UTC+10:00 (AEST)
- Postcode: 4818
Localities around Bluewater
Clemant	Coral Sea	Toolakea
Clemant	Bluewater	Coral Sea; Saunders Beach
Bluewater Park	Lynam	Yabulu; Black River

Bluewater is a town and coastal suburb in the City of Townsville, Queensland, Australia. In the 2021 census, the suburb of Bluewater had a population of 1,085 people.

The coastal town of Bluewater Beach is also within the suburb.

== Geography ==
The suburb of Bluewater is approximately 31.9 kilometres (19.8 mi) by road north-west of Townsville CBD. It is bounded to the south-east by Althaus Creek (19.15250°S 146.60167°E).

As its name suggests, the town of Bluewater Beach is on the coast of the Coral Sea, while the town of Bluewater is inland on the Bruce Highway, which enters the locality from south-east (Yabulu) and exits to the north-west (Clemant).

The suburb is popular with residents who prefer larger lot sizes and is home to a number of properties with hobby farms and horse agistment. It is also home to solar farms.

== History ==
Bluewater is situated in the traditional Nyawigi Aboriginal country. The origin of the suburb name Bluewater is from the adjacent Bluewater Creek that was shown on a district map from 1886.

Bluewater was settled in the late nineteenth century, and was close to the Purono rail siding, constructed in 1919 on the extension of the North Coast railway line from Townsville to Ingham. During World War II, Bluewater became campground to a number of service personnel whose responsibility it was to resist Japanese invasion.

It was not until 1946 that land was first subdivided along Bluewater Beach, followed by subdivisions of Toolakea Beach and the Bluewater Township in the 1950s.

Bluewater Provisional School opened on 3 June 1957.In 1958 it was renamed Bluewater Creek Provisional School. In 1959 it became Bluewater Creek State School. In 1960 it was renamed Bluewater State School.

Bluewater Post Office opened by May 1960.

The community was badly flooded on 31 January 2019. The wet weather and consequent flooding was expected to continue for another week.

== Demographics ==
In the 2016 census, the suburb of Bluewater had a population of 1,040 people.

In the 2021 census, the suburb of Bluewater had a population of 1,085 people.

The census data includes the population of neighbouring Blue Hills which is not separately reported.

== Education ==
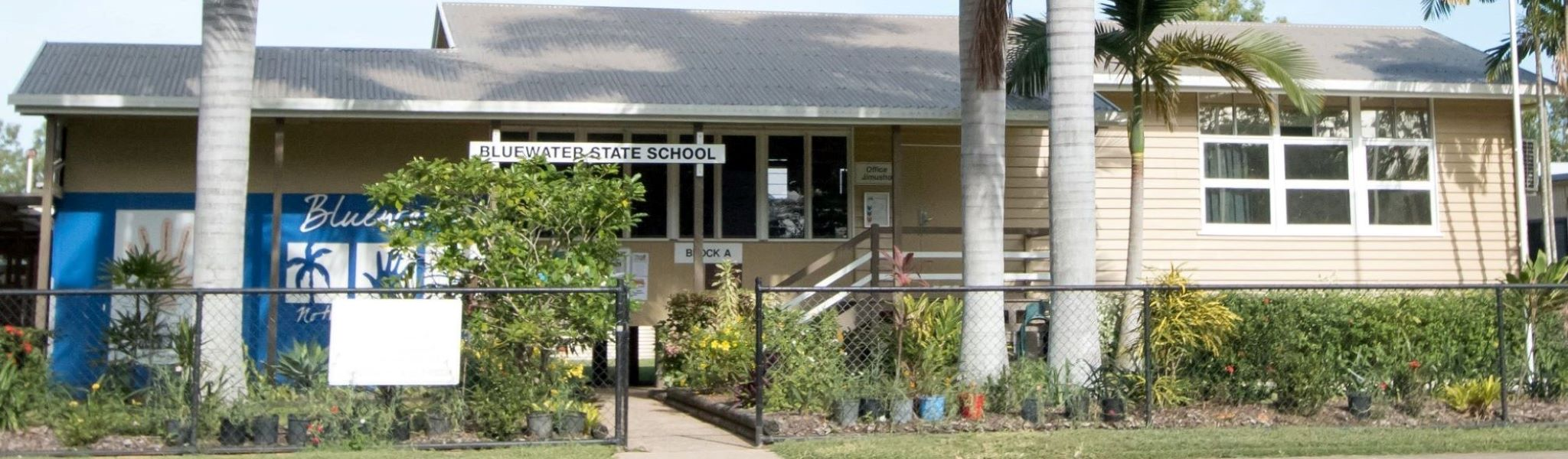
Bluewater State School, 2016

Bluewater State School is a government primary (Prep-6) school for boys and girls at 1-3 Ditton Street with its entrance on Buckby Street (19.1748°S 146.5556°E). In 2018, the school had an enrolment of 438 students with 32 teachers (30 full-time equivalent) and 22 non-teaching staff (12 full-time equivalent).

There are no secondary schools in Bluewater. The nearest government secondary school is Northern Beaches State High School in Deeragun to the south-east.

== Amenities and attractions ==
The Townsville City Council operate a mobile library service which visits the Community Centre at Bluewater on Monday afternoons.

There is a boat ramp at Bluewater Road on the north bank of Althaus Creek (19.1571°S 146.5985°E). It is managed by the Townsville City Council. Other amenities in the area include a Girl Guides training and camping centre. There is a waste transfer station towards the end of Bluewater Drive.

Bluewater Park is a popular tourist destination with designated free campsites.

== See also ==
- 1998 Townsville floods
