= Range Hotel site, Hervey Range =

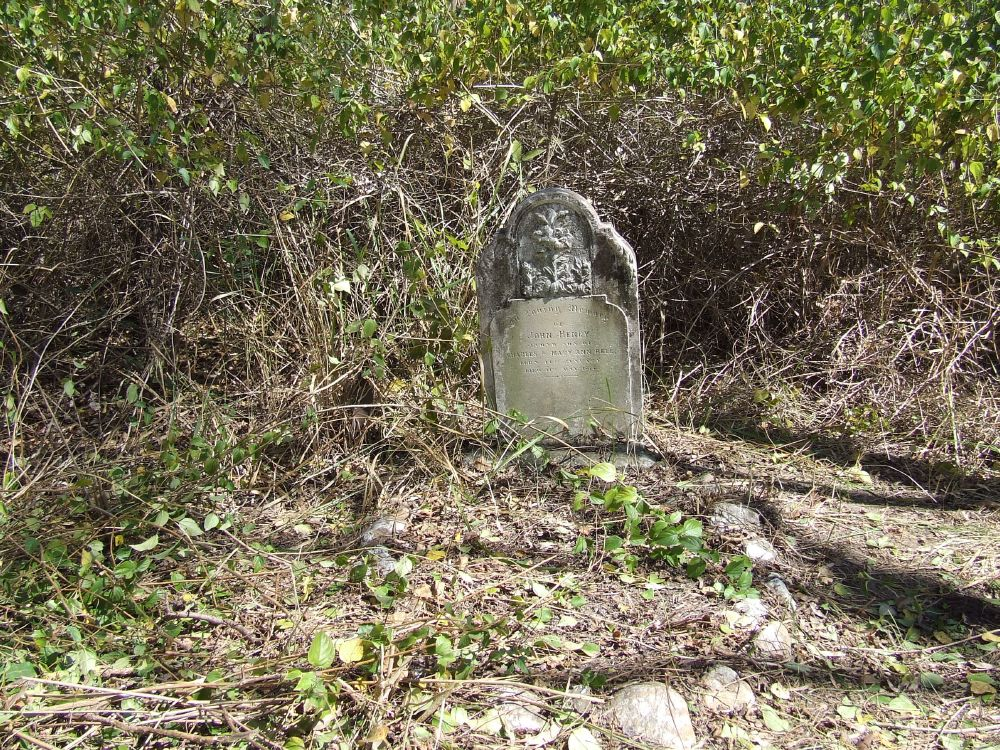
- Range Hotel, Burial Ground – Bell grave, 2008

- Location within Queensland Location within Australia
- 19.3514°S 146.4782°E
- Location: Page Road (old Hervey Range Road), Hervey Range, City of Townsville, Queensland, Australia

History
- Design period: 1840s–1860s (mid-19th century)
- Built: 1865–1866

Queensland Heritage Register
- Official name: Range Hotel, Burial Ground and Camping Reserve
- Type: archaeological
- Designated: 6 March 2009
- Reference no.: 700003
- Significant period: 1865/66–1872 (Hotel and burials); 1865–1970s (Camping);
- Significant components: ceramic scatter/deposit, glass scatter/deposit, headstone

Range Hotel, Burial Ground and Camping Reserve site is a heritage-listed archeological site (of a former hotel, camping ground, and cemetery) at Page Road (old Hervey Range Road), Hervey Range, City of Townsville, Queensland, Australia. The hotel was built in 1865 to 1866. It was added to the Queensland Heritage Register on 6 March 2009.

== History ==
The Range Hotel, Burial Ground and Camping Reserve includes a section of the original route of the Hervey Range Road to Thorntons Gap, archaeological artefacts and a small burial ground associated with the former Range Hotel which was built in 1866, but is no longer extant. The Hervey Range Road was established c. 1865–66 and extended from present day Townsville to Hervey Range at Thorntons Gap. At the base of the Hervey Range, at least one hotel was established in 1866 to service the increasing number of people and stock travelling along this early inland transportation route, and as a result a small community developed. In 1872, a camping reserve was also gazetted around the Range Hotel site to provide additional accommodation options. By the early 1880s, the introduction of the Great Northern railway to Charters Towers resulted in a reduction in traffic along the road. The Range Hotel closed in 1884 and the adjacent sections of the Hervey Range Road became obsolete and fell into disrepair following construction of a deviation to the south in the 1970s.

Settlement in north Queensland occurred comparatively late in the history of European occupation of Australia. The Kennedy District was the first region opened for settlement in north Queensland, and was officially proclaimed from 1 January 1861. The district comprised 51,000 square miles, extending to the north beyond present day Cardwell, west to the Great Dividing Range, and south beyond Mackay.

The year 1861 witnessed a rush of settlers and squatters to the new district to secure pastoral runs. By the end of the year, the best runs were selected with 454 applications lodged for over 31,000 square miles of land. The rapid expansion west into inland Queensland necessitated the development of suitable transportation routes. The first inland road was surveyed by John Melton Black and built by employees of Black and Co. (later Towns and Co.) under the supervision of Andrew Ball, with a subsidy of £500 from the Queensland Government. The road was blazed in 1865 and ran due west from the present day Townsville across the Bohle and Alice Rivers and up what was then known as the Dalrymple Range (later Hervey Range) at Thorntons Gap to places further west and to the gulf. It was the only access to inland areas during the early years of settlement in the region.

The road was just a track, with the only steep part being the pull up to Thorntons Gap. Despite the steepness of this part of the route, it was still the easiest road from the northern parts of Kennedy District to the sea then blazed. The roads in this period were hazardous, rough, potholed and boggy during the wet season.

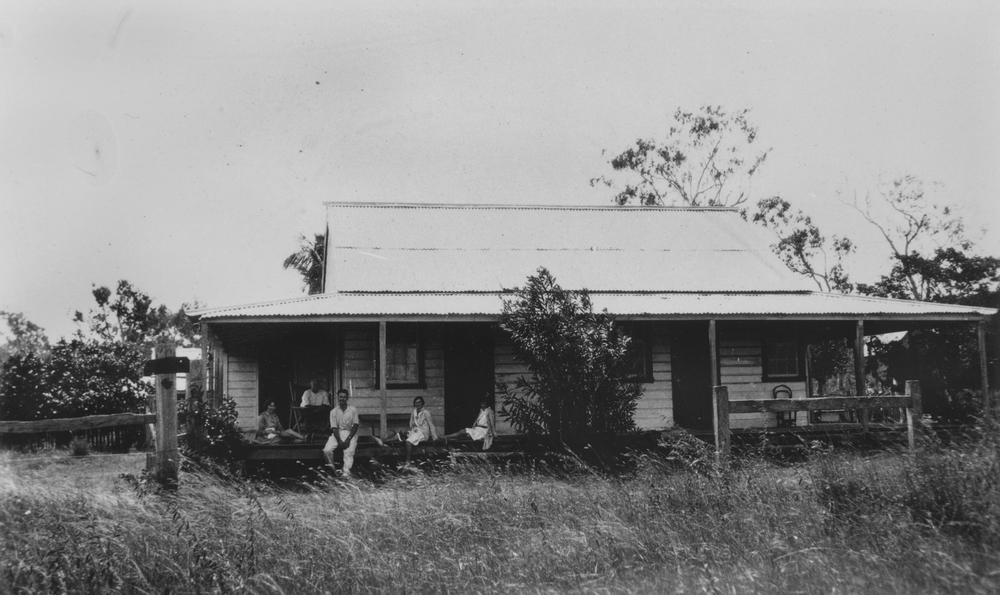
Hervey's Range Hotel, circa 1930

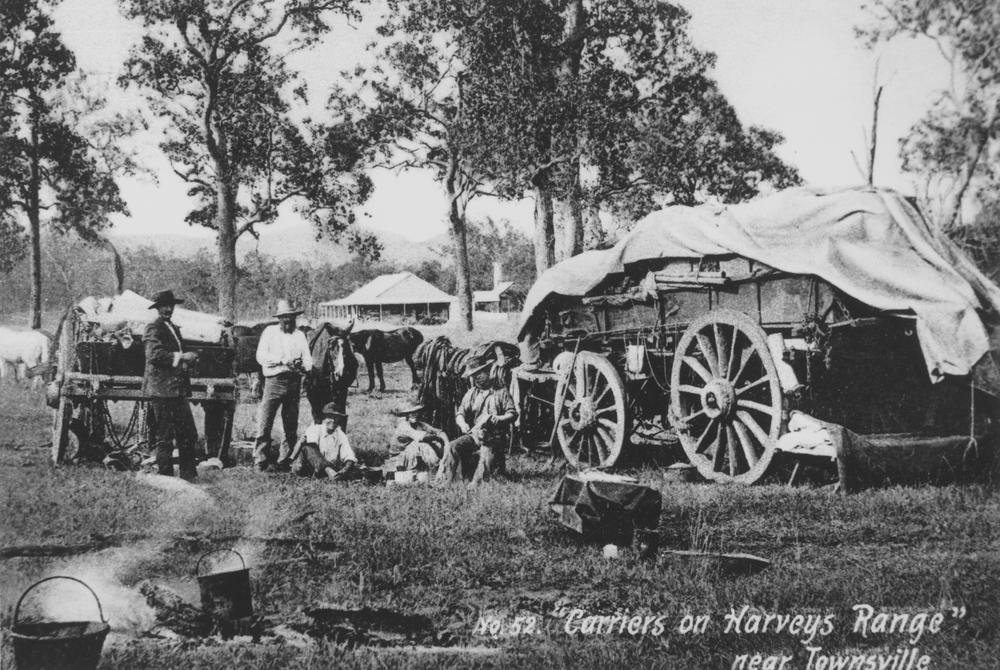
Men and wagons at Harveys Range Hotel, circa 1912

Hotels and wayside inns appeared along the major routes, and licensed hotels were established along the Hervey Range Road. As it could take up to four days for a bullock team and wagon to travel from Townsville to the foot of the Hervey Range, and then a further day to climb the range to Thorntons Gap to the Eureka Hotel, a market for accommodations was identified. At least one hotel and inn was established at the foot of the range, the Range Hotel, which was erected in 1865–66. There may have also been another at the foot of the range, called The Gate Hotel, possibly built close to The Range Hotel, although little is known about this second hotel. Another hotel, the Eureka Hotel, was built at the summit of Thorntons Gap in 1865 at the time of the road construction.

The Range Hotel was built by James Edward Mead in c. 1866. He is believed to have been the same person who tendered for the Heidelberg run on the Bowen River at Rockhampton in 1861, but never stocked it. Mead had originally applied for a licence for the Royal Oak, 25 miles (40 km) from Cleveland Bay, but the hotel was named the Range when it was advertised in 1866 as being 20 miles (32 km) from Townsville with two sitting rooms and six bedrooms. The Range Hotel was a long single storey timber structure with a gable roof and front rooms opening onto the verandah. The hotel was "very pleasantly situated" and "the proprietor has added to the natural beauty by planting some Leichhardt trees around the house which looked very graceful".

The second proprietor, Robert Williamson, was also a carrier and is said to have been the first person, along with John Melton Black, to have taken wagons through Thorntons Gap. A small community grew up around the hotel, which is known to have included a blacksmith shop owned by John McNeill, and a small burial ground.

In March 1866, a government gang started improving the road, although nothing was done to lessen the steepness of the ascent to Thorntons Gap. By December 1866, the road was being heavily used by carriers and travellers, and at times there could be 100 or more wagons strung out along the length of the road. In an attempt to recoup some of the cost of the road, the Department of Public Works installed a toll gate at the foot of the Range in 1867, adjacent to the Range Hotel. The cost to carriers regularly using the road was high – 3 shillings for a two-wheeled dray or wagon, drawn by three or four horses, or four bullocks – prompting teamsters to find an alternate route inland. By the following year, the toll on Hervey Range Road had been removed altogether, and it was again being used by carriers, teamsters and travellers journeying inland and on to the Gulf of Carpentaria. It became known as the Georgetown Road, and it remained the main road from Townsville to Georgetown into the 20th century.

Gold was discovered near Charters Towers in late 1871 and in August 1872 the Charters Towers Goldfield was officially proclaimed. Following these discoveries, the Hervey Range Road also became an important transportation route for people journeying to and from these goldfields. In 1872, the area of land surrounding the Range Hotel and the road was also gazetted as a camping reserve. The camp is marked on Robert L. Jack's Geological Sketch Map of the District between Charters Towers Goldfields & the Coast produced in 1878 as "Camp III" and it shown situated adjacent One Mile Creek, a branch of the Black River. Although the introduction of the railway from Townsville to Charters Towers reduced traffic on the Hervey Range Road in the 1880s, it remained a vital link with cattle stations in the inland and northern regions of the district. The Range hotel finally closed in about 1884.

In the 1930s, the road up the Hervey Range was upgraded using funds under a major unemployment relief scheme, allowing motor vehicle access to the top of the range for the first time since its construction in the 1860s. Thuringowa Shire Council regularly maintained the Hervey Range Road from the 1930s until it became obsolete with the construction of the Hervey Range Developmental Road in the 1970s.

During the construction of the Greenvale Railway Line in the 1970s, the camping reserve was used as a camp site for Thiess Brothers workers employed on the line.

== Description ==
The camping reserve comprises some 464 hectares in the Hervey Range, approximately 36 kilometres (22 mi) southwest of Townsville. The topography of the reserve is relatively flat. However, to the west of the reserve the gradient increases dramatically immediately to ascending the Hervey Range. The reserve is bisected by the former Hervey Range Road (now renamed Page Road), the Hervey Range Developmental Road, and more recently by high voltage electricity transmission lines.

Native and introduced vegetation dominates the area, with Moreton Bay ash (Corymbia tesselaris), Poplar gum (Eucalyptus alba), blue gum (Eucalyptus tereticornis) and narrow leaved ironbark (Eucalyptus crebra) being the most common species. There is a thick cover of grasses in the woodland understorey, comprising Black spear grass (Heteropogon sp.) and kangaroo grass (Themeda spp.). Cocky apple (Planchonia careya) and native Gardenia (Kailarsenia ochreata) are common woodland species in the area. Introduced species include Lantana sp., mango trees (Mangifera sp.) and Agave sp.

The former Hervey Range Road cuts through the reserve and continues to the top of the Hervey Range to Thorntons Gap. The route of the road is still clearly visible, particularly in the largely intact steep sections. There are some washed out sections on the climb up the range. The course of the road has changed little since its construction.

The Range Hotel is no longer extant. Archaeological artefacts, including late 19th century bottle glass and ceramics indicate the likely location of the hotel. Agave plants at this site may have been part of the hotel garden. A small burial ground is located some 150 metres (490 ft) south of the former Hervey Range Road and Range Hotel site. The graves are overgrown with lantana and spear grass. There are three ornate sandstone headstones of a type often found in North Queensland burials dating before c. 1880. No maker's names are present although it is likely the headstones were imported from Brisbane with the inscriptions added locally. The lettering on the headstones has weathered and one is lying horizontal on the ground. Each grave is encircled by white-painted stones. The graves have been identified as follows:

1. Francis Earl, a local squatter who died of fever at the Range Hotel on 12 March 1866. The inscription reads:

Sacred to the Memory of Francis John Earl Died at the Range Hotel On the 12th March 1866 Aged 25 years In the midst of life we are in death (verse illegible)

2. Mary Langton, a mother of three small children under 4 years old, who committed suicide by taking poison at the age of 28 years. Her husband, John Langton, carried goods from Townsville to Dalrymple Township. The inscription reads:

Sacred to the Memory of Mary Langton Who departed this life 6th December 1873 Aged 28 years The Lord giveth and the Lord taketh away Blessed by the name of the Lord

3. John Henry Bell, a child of 4 years, who died of inflammation of the lungs in May 1879. His father, Charles, was a carrier and lived at Bellgrove on the Hervey Range Road. The inscription reads:

In loving memory of John Henry Second son of Charles & Mark Ann Bell Born 14th January Died 11th May 1875

The Langton and Earl headstones are aligned north–south about 8 metres (26 ft) apart, with the Bell headstone between them, about 5 metres (16 ft) northwest of the Langton headstone. The layout of the graves suggests that there may have been as many as five plots between the Langton and Earl burials and three rows of grave plots. The positions of the graves imply a possible original layout of at least 21 grave plots in three rows of seven. The graves were likely marked with wooden grave markers which have since been destroyed by fire, termites or fungal decay.

A dense concentration of archaeological material is located south of the former Hervey Range Road and the power transmission lines on the high bank of a creek. Some material is eroding into the creek bed. The surface artefacts are visible in a 20-square-metre (220 sq ft) area, although low visibility due to vegetation cover obscures the full extent of the site. Artefacts include glass bottle fragments and patterned ceramic fragments datable to the 19th century. This may be associated with a potential second hotel situated at the site. An old softwood tree (possibly Terminalia sp.) situated in the middle of this area bears a rectangular-shaped blaze on its trunk, measuring 60 by 30 centimetres (24 in × 12 in).

The remains of the Thiess Brothers camp in this area comprise wooden stumps, posts, concrete slabs, an old telephone line and a concrete explosives magazine. These remains represent another phase in the history and development of the camping reserve.

== Heritage listing ==
The Range Hotel site was listed on the Queensland Heritage Register on 6 March 2009 having satisfied the following criteria.

The site have potential to reveal important information on aspects of Queensland's history, including early road construction techniques, early transport and communications, the development of a small, isolated community, and the earliest residents of the region. Features identified within the place include a section of the original Hervey Range Road to Thorntons Gap, the remains of the former Range Hotel, one of the earliest hotels and inns established in the region (c. 1866), and an historical burial ground.

The old Hervey Range Road is important in demonstrating early communication patterns in the Townsville region. The road is one of the few surviving examples of a roadway dating from early European settlement in the region and was the initial route inland from the port of Townsville to the hinterland areas. The camping reserve provided a resting place for travelers and livestock using the road between 1864 and the 1970s. The route of the road remains clearly identifiable within the camping reserve and beyond where it climbs up the Hervey Range.

Archaeological surveys of the section of the old Hervey Range Road (now known as Page Road) have the potential to reveal important information about early road construction techniques. The remains of the original route comprises one of only a few surviving examples of a roadway from the earliest European settlement period in north Queensland. The route of the road is still clearly identifiable in parts though additional archaeological investigations will aid the documentation of previously poorly understood changes to this once important transportation route.

The site has potential to reveal important information relating to the development and survival of a small community during the period of early settlement in north Queensland. There is archaeological potential for substantial remains of the former Range Hotel and an associated settlement to be located near the site of the identified bottle dump and burial grounds. Little is known of the composition of this small, ad hoc settlement, other than that it also included a blacksmith.

Archaeological investigations of the former hotel sites within the camping reserve have potential to reveal important information relating to the operation of, and custom of, early frontier hotels and lodgings. Analysis of materials from the former Range Hotel, and the speculated existence of a second hotel called The Gate Hotel, will help comparative analysis with other early frontier hotels situated along this and other important transport and communications corridors. Analysis of archaeological artefacts will help inform on the Eureka Hotel, which is situated at the top of Hervey Range and linked to this place by the old Hervey Range Road, and provide important comparative data for the artefacts recovered from other early hotel sites across Queensland.

The burial ground adjacent to the former Range Hotel features one of the oldest extant headstones in the region, the grave of 24-year-old Francis Earl, a local squatter who died of fever at the Range Hotel on 12 March 1866. The Range Hotel burial ground contains sandstone headstones that are highly characteristic of nineteenth century cemeteries in this region, with relatively ornate decoration typically found on graves dating from before c.1880. There is potential that the recorded burial ground contains additional graves (possibly as many as 21) which also date to the earliest European settlement of the Townsville region. Consequently, there is potential to provide new and important information that will contribute to our understanding of the early history and demography of settlement in the region, including but not limited to why burial grounds are found associated with hotels, why people were buried there and not in formal cemeteries, the patterning of burial grounds in the region.

The site have potential for archaeological deposits associated with travellers journeying to and from the Charters Towers Goldfields and inland pastoral properties. Analysis of these archaeological remains will provide important insights into the materials being transported and used by the diverse range of peoples transiting to and from the area since 1865, but especially to the Charters Towers Goldfields from 1872.
