= City of Thuringowa =

Former City of Thuringowa
- Local government area
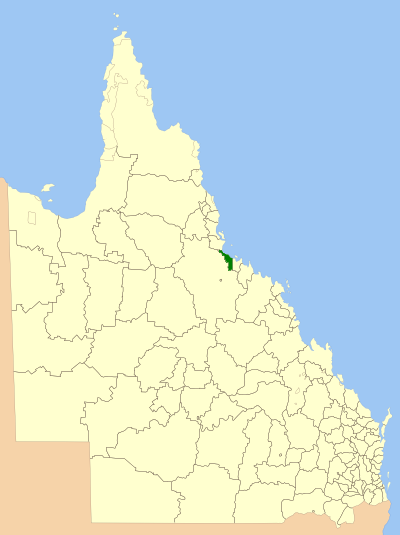
- Location within Queensland

- Country: Australia
- State: Queensland
- Region: W/SW from Townsville
- Established: 1846 1st Settlement, 1879–1903 Division, 1903–1986 Shire, 1986–2008 City.

Area
  - Total: 1,866.9 km^{2} (720.8 sq mi)

Population
  - Total: 59,164 (2006 census)
  - Density: 31.6910/km^{2} (82.0794/sq mi)
- Website: Former City of Thuringowa

The City of Thuringowa (19°18′26″S 146°43′54″E) was a city and local government area in North Queensland, Australia covering the northern and western parts of what is now Townsville. The suburb of Thuringowa Central is the main business centre in this area.

Thuringowa was named after the German state of Thuringia where the shire's first chairman, John von Stieglitz, originated. Prior to its proclamation as a city on 1 January 1986, Thuringowa was a large rural shire, almost surrounding the City of Townsville.

In 2007 the Queensland Government recommended that the Thuringowa City Council and the Townsville City Council be merged as part of the review of councils and boundaries, with the merged entity to be referred to as the Townsville City Council and the city being called the New Townsville City. The transition was completed with the election of a new combined Council on 15 March 2008.

== History ==
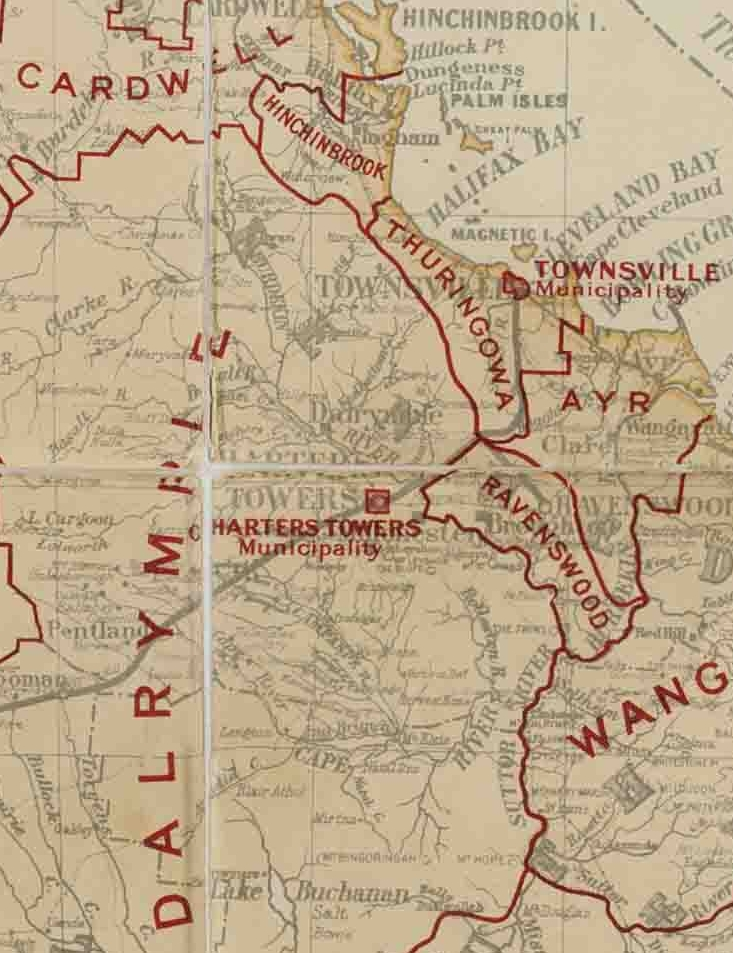
Map of Thuringowa Division and adjacent local government areas, March 1902

=== Early history ===
Prior to European settlement, the Nyawaygi Aboriginal people lived in the area around Thuringowa, Townsville and the Burdekin. The earliest European on record to live in Thuringowa was James Morrill whose boat washed ashore in 1846.

In 1860, the newly formed Queensland Government passed an act opening up the area to pastoral leases, and by 1861 there were many runs in Thuringowa. By 1865, Robert Towns and John Melton Black had purchased a number of properties throughout Thuringowa. In 1865 Robert Towns built a boiling down works – at the time, there was no facilities for shipping cattle or sheep, so in 1865 Andrew Ball and Mark Reid left Woodstock Station to find a harbour around the Cleveland Bay shores and the Town and port of Townsville was established at the mouth of Ross Creek.

=== Local government ===
The City of Thuringowa had its genesis in the Thuringowa Division, created on 11 November 1879 as one of 74 divisions around Queensland under the Divisional Boards Act 1879 with a population of 638.

On 16 January 1888, the Ayr Division was created out of Subdivision 3 of the Thuringowa Division in 1888 under the Divisional Boards Act 1887.

Considerable progress ensued over the following decades – by 1902, Thuringowa had 1,020 dwellings listed on its ratebooks. Early chairmen Arthur Bundock and Joseph Hodel were involved in construction of key architecture such as the Ross River Bridge, the bridge at the Causeway and the Stuart Creek Bridge. These roads and bridges were constructed to serve not only Thuringowa's rural base but also its residential subdivisions of Hermit Park, Mundingburra and Rosslea. Water reticulation and sanitary services were established in these suburbs and street lighting and beautification work was carried out along Charters Towers Road. Also during this period the Council's first administration building was constructed at the Causeway, near the intersection of Flinders Street West and Ingham Road.

Under the Local Authorities Act 1902, divisions were renamed shires, and on 31 March 1903, Thuringowa Division became the Shire of Thuringowa. The period up to 1918 was one of consolidation and minor works, rather than major projects.

In 1918, much of the Shire of Thuringowa's urban area was transferred to Townsville. This initially caused great hardship for the Shire, as its rate base had been reduced to 2,500 ratepayers and its council headquarters was outside the shire. The Council adopted a conservative approach to policy during this period that included not only the depression years of the 1930s but also during World War II, when the area became an important staging point and was host to significant numbers of military personnel.

From the 1960s onwards, significant suburban development and growth took place in the area and the Council was providing new facilities and infrastructure. In 1979, a new Shire administration centre was constructed, moving it back into the local area, and on 1 January 1986, the Shire of Thuringowa became the City of Thuringowa.

In 2007, the state government engaged in a programme of local government reform centred on amalgamating LGAs across Queensland. The Local Government Advisory Committee recommended that the Cities of Thuringowa and Townsville should be amalgamated into a new City of Townsville. Though it was the source of some controversy, the merger ultimately took place, with the City of Thuringowa ceasing to exist in March 2008. Les Tyrell, Thuringowa's mayor of 17 years, won against Townsville's mayor, 19-year incumbent Tony Mooney, in the mayoral election for the combined city.

== Demographics ==
Thuringowa grew in population rapidly from the 1980s becoming one of the fastest-growing cities in Australia. The population had increased from 26,000 in 1986 to over 65,000 in 2007.

year	census population	% growth per annum
1936	1,500	
1954	2,627	
1961	2,572	
1966	2,863	2.17
1971	3,432	3.69
1976	10,914	26.03
1981	17,728	10.19
1986	30,104	11.17
1991	37,722	4.62
1996	44,319	3.27
2001	52,715	2.90
2006	62,935	2.96
2007	65,782	4.5

More: Thuringowa travel guide from Wikivoyage

== Suburbs ==
The City of Thuringowa included the following settlements:

Urban

- Alice River
- Bluewater (beach)
- Bohle
- Bohle Plains
- Bushland Beach (beach)
- Condon
- Deeragun
- Kelso
- Kirwan
- Pinnacles
- Rasmussen
- Thuringowa Central

Rural

- Balgal Beach (beach)
- Black River
- Bluewater Park
- Burdell (beach)
- Jensen
- Mount Low (beach)
- Mutarnee
- Paluma
- Rollingstone
- Saunders Beach (beach)
- Shaw
- Toolakea (beach)
- Toomulla (beach)
- Yabulu (beach)

== Municipal leaders ==
The following is a list of chairmen and mayors of the Thuringowa Division, Shire of Thuringowa and City of Thuringowa from 1880 until 2008:

Year	Name
1880–1882	William Aplin
1882–1883	Frederick Gordon
1883–1884	James Miller and Arthur Glennie Bundock
1884–1885	William Clayton and Arthur Glennie Bundock
1885–1888	Arthur Glennie Bundock
1888–1890	Frederick Johnson
1890–1891	Joseph Hodel
1891–1892	Joseph Hodel and Frederick Johnson
1892–1898	Joseph Hodel
1898–1900	Robert Mawby
1900–1901	Frederick Johnson
1901–1910	Joseph Hodel
1910–1912	Henry Abbot
1912–1914	Joseph Hodel

Year	Name
1914–1915	Edward Crowder or Joseph Hodel
1915–1916	Joseph Hodel
1916–1917	Edward Crowder
1917–1920	William Ireland
1920–1929	James Cummins
1930–1948	Charles Wallace Wordsworth
March–May 1949	James Kelso
1949–1960	William Howard Favell Wordsworth
1961–1966	John Richard Brabon
1967–1969	William DeCourcey
1970–1973	John Richard Brabon
1973–1976	William DeCourcey
1976–1991	Dan Gleeson (Mayor 1986–91)
1991–2008	Les Tyrell
