= Hervey Range Developmental Road =

Road in Queensland, Australia

Hervey Range Developmental Road Hervey Range Road Queensland

General information
- Type: Rural road
- Length: 125 km (78 mi)
- Route number(s): Entire route

Major junctions
- East end: Thuringowa Drive, and Ross River Road, Kirwan
- Bruce Highway; Black River Road; Dotswood Road
- West end: Gregory Highway, Basalt

Location(s)
- Major settlements: Thuringowa Central, Bohle Plains, Rangewood, Alice River, Hervey Range

Hervey Range Developmental Road (alternate spellings: "Herveys", "Hervey's") is a continuous 125-kilometre (78 mi) road route in the Townsville and Charters Towers local government areas of Queensland, Australia. It is designated as State Route 72. It is a state-controlled regional road (number 83A).

== Route description ==
The road commences as Hervey Range Road (State Route 72) at an intersection with Garbutt–Upper Ross Road (Thuringowa Drive / Riverway Drive) and Ross River Road (see below), on a mid-point of Kirwan and Thuringowa Central. State Route 72 continues east on Ross River Road. The road proceeds west through Thuringowa Central, passing between Kirwan and Condon, and crossing the Bohle River as it enters Bohle Plains. Here it runs under the Bruce Highway at an incomplete diamond interchange. From the start to this point the road has a four-lane divided carriageway, which reverts to two lanes undivided just west of the Bruce Highway.

Continuing west the road passes between Rangewood and Alice River, and then crosses the Alice River, a tributary of the Black River, and follows the boundary between the localities of Hervey Range and Black River. After crossing Scrubby Creek and Canal Creek, passing the exit to Black River Road to the north-east, entering Hervey Range, and crossing Log Creek, the road turns south-east. It runs parallel to the Black River as it approaches the ascent of the Hervey Range. At the peak of the range, following a circuitous climb, it passes through the southern tip of Lynam, enters the Charters Towers Region and then continues to the south-east, still in the locality of Hervey Range.

On entering the locality of Dotswood the road turns to the west. It continues west, passing the exit to Dotswood Road to the south and crossing several creeks and the Star River before reaching the Burdekin River, which it crosses into the locality of Basalt. After turning south-west it reaches an intersection with the Gregory Highway, where it ends.

About 2 kilometres (1.2 mi) of this road has a gradient greater than 5%, of which 440 metres (1,440 ft) is between 10 and 15%, and 320 metres (1,050 ft) is greater than 15%. The highest point on the road is 421 metres (1,381 ft) and the lowest is 15.2 metres (50 ft). The road is fully sealed.

For communities along the Gulf Developmental Road, this road is part of the shortest route to east coast centres from Townsville to Mackay.

=== Road widening ===
A project to widen more than 3 kilometres (1.9 mi) of this road, at a cost of $8.9 million, was to be completed late in 2021.

== Ross River Road ==
Ross River Road
- Location: Townsville Connection Road (Bowen Road / Charters Towers Road), Mundingburra to Garbutt-Upper Ross Road (Thuringowa Drive / Riverway Drive), Kirwan
- Length: 8.1 km (5.0 mi)
- Route number: 72

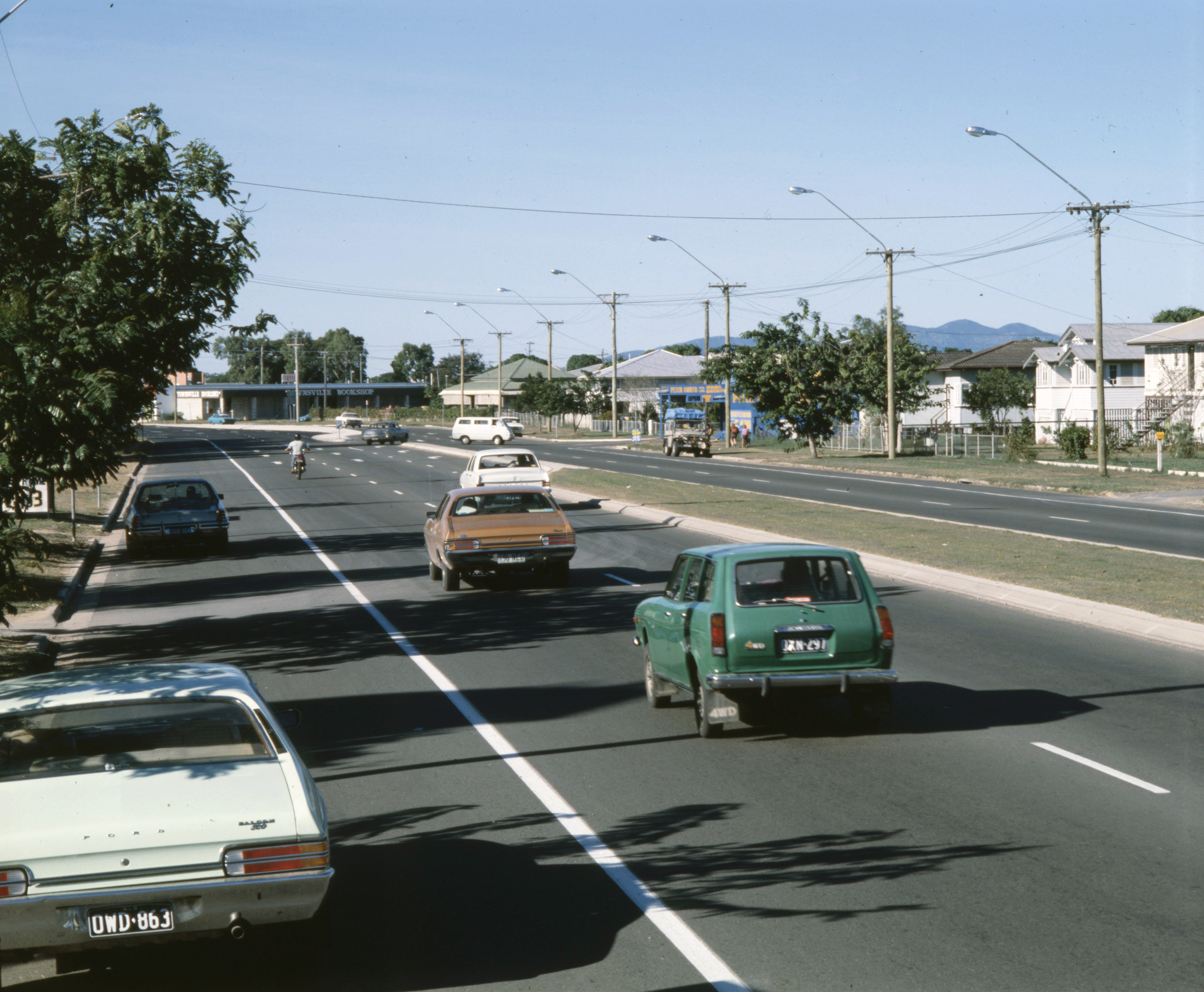
Ross River Road, Townsville, 1978

Ross River Road is a state-controlled district road (number 612). It starts at an intersection with Townsville Connection Road (Bowen Road / Charters Towers Road) (State Route 17) in Mundingburra. It runs west as State Route 72, crossing Douglas-Garbutt Road (Nathan Street), for 8.1 kilometres (5.0 mi) to Kirwan, where it ends at an intersection with Garbutt–Upper Ross Road (Thuringowa Drive / Riverway Drive), while State Route 72 continues west on Hervey Range Road. The road's only major intersection is with Douglas–Garbutt Road.

== History ==
The original Hervey Range Road, now known as Page Road, was a steep and difficult track. It was constructed in 1865, and was then the only way to travel from Townsville to the west.

Gold was discovered in Charters Towers in 1871. In the period 1872 to 1899 the population grew to about 25,000. The railway opened in 1882, effectively replacing a two-day coach ride from Townsville for new arrivals.

The current Hervey's Range Road (as it was then called) was opened in April, 1933.

== Major intersections ==
All distances are from Google Maps.

LGA	Location	km	mi	Destinations	Notes
Townsville	Kirwan / Thuringowa Central midpoint	0	0.0	Thuringowa Drive – north – Kirwan; Ross River Road – northeast – Aitkenvale, Mundingburra; Riverway Drive – south – Condon	Eastern end of Hervey Range Developmental Road (State Route 72). Road continues west as Hervey Range Road.
Townsville	Bohle Plains	3.4– 3.8	2.1– 2.4	Bruce Highway – north – Deeragun – south – Condon	No access to Bruce Highway southbound for westbound traffic on Hervey Range Road. Road continues west.
Charters Towers	Hervey Range	17.0	10.6	Black River Road – northeast – Black River and Bruce Highway	Road continues west.
Charters Towers	Dotswood	63.5	39.5	Dotswood Road – south – Mingela and Flinders Highway	Road continues west.
Charters Towers	Basalt	125	78	Gregory Highway – northwest – Greenvale – southeast – Charters Towers.	Western end of Hervey Range Developmental Road (State Route 72).
1.000 mi = 1.609 km; 1.000 km = 0.621 mi: Incomplete access

== See also ==
- List of road routes in Queensland
- List of numbered roads in Queensland
