= 1998 Townsville floods =

Natural disaster in Queensland, Australia

Coordinates: 19°15′29″S 146°49′06″E

1998 Townsville and Thuringowa city floods
- Date: 10 January 1998–13 January 1998
- Location: Townsville and Thuringowa, North Queensland, Australia
- Deaths: 1
- Property damage: A$123 million

The 1998 Townsville and Thuringowa city floods began on 10 January 1998, the cities of Townsville and Thuringowa in North Queensland, Australia, were inundated by one of the worst floods in the cities' history. Excessive rainfall caused the Ross and Black rivers to both burst their banks and local stormwater drainage systems were overwhelmed. One fatality occurred, 7,454 properties were flooded, and there was considerable damage to businesses, roads, and other infrastructure.

== Floods ==
=== Weather conditions ===
A remnant of ex-Cyclone Sid in the Coral Sea near Cardwell produced a band of strong gales that slowly moved south between Cardwell and Bowen. Wind gusted up to 90 kilometres per hour (56 mph) as it moved south into the Ingham area, and Ingham received approximately 295 millimetres (11.6 in) between 9 pm and 9 am the morning of 9 January. During the day, the heaviest band of rain kept moving south to be on top of the Townsville area, although Townsville had only relatively light rain during the day, (approx. 43 mm (1.7 in) between 9 am and 6 pm). Overnight intense rainfall caused severe flash flooding and high flood levels in the streams and rivers in the area. Approximately 335 millimetres (13.2 in) of rain fell on 10 January between 6 pm and midnight and a further 236 millimetres (9.3 in) fell in the next three hours. Late into the evening, the heaviest rainfall and gale-force winds continued. At its heaviest, the rain fell at 100 millimetres (3.9 in) per hour.

On 10 and 11 January, Townsville airport recorded 549 millimetres (21.6 in) in 24 hours, and from 11 and 12 January through to 9 am on 13 January, 245 millimetres (9.6 in) fell, with a resultant three-day record of 794 millimetres (31.3 in). The period of 10 to 11 January was subsequently dubbed by Townsville residents as the Night of Noah. Total rainfall at Townsville airport for the week was recorded as 886 millimetres (34.9 in). In the 24 hours of 10 January, Magnetic Island received 774 millimetres (30.5 in) of rain, the maximum in the Townsville region. Other areas around Townsville CBD had readings ranging from 895 to 1,300 millimetres (35.2 to 51.2 in).

Rain eased a little by 11 January, but some heavy rain continued to pass through. Ex-Cyclone Sid, by now a weak surface low, sat just to the north of Townsville during 12 January and by midday the trough had redeveloped and heavy rain moved into the Townsville CBD for the rest of the day.

=== Impact ===
As most streets in the Townsville CBD are flat, the city streets were underwater and blocked by fallen trees and power lines. Water was up to three metres (nine point eight feet) deep through parts of the CBD and hundreds of businesses and homes were inundated in both Townsville and Thuringowa, plus around 200 people were evacuated.

The neighbourhood of Black River was badly hit; 48 homes were uninhabitable, 14 homes destroyed and 8 were washed out to sea when the river broke its banks. At Bluewater, 40 homes were badly damaged, while five other homes in the city were destroyed plus hundreds flooded, phones were out in most parts the city, and fallen power lines and flooded substations cut power to around half of Townsville homes. A landslide, estimated to be 20,000 cubic metres (710,000 cu ft) destroyed twelve units at a Magnetic Island resort, and damaged a further six units, and another landslide destroyed a million dollar home on Stanton Terrace. Boulders were also loosened on Castle Hill and rolled down into Stuart Street in the Townsville CBD. That night, the Queensland Government declared Townsville as a state of emergency, with resultant access to federal and state government resources and funding.

Many businesses had closed due to the weekend damage, and the additional rainfall caused a complete shutdown of the city. Many workers battled renewed floodwaters as they tried to get home, and emergency workers abandoned clean-up work for the rest of the day.

Despite the construction of the Ross River Dam in 1974 across the Ross River, located approximately 25 kilometres (16 mi) upriver of Townsville, and subsequent dam upgrades during the mid-1980s, the dam was not spilling at the time of the 1998 flood, with most of the floodwaters falling downriver of the dam wall.

== Aftermath ==
The morning of 11 January was described as the worst devastation in the city since Cyclone Althea in 1971. Subsequent reports claimed that 7,454 properties were flooded, of which fourteen were destroyed, 200 suffered senior damage with flood levels of more than one metre (three point three feet) above the ground floor, 2,200 suffered moderate damage, and 4,650 received minor damage.

Most roads in the city were impassable. The Bruce Highway was closed to the north and south of the city, all North Coast rail links were also closed as they were under water, the airport was closed to all commercial traffic as the runway was under water and the navigation aids were out of order, electricity was disconnected in most of the city, water was also disconnected in the northern suburbs of Thuringowa, all sewage pumping stations were inoperable (including one that was submersed by floodwater). Queensland Nickel's tailings dam at the Yabulu had overflowed, spilling pollutants into the nearby flooded river and out to the sea. A Townsville resident found two cars and a yacht in his yard, and one person was confirmed dead after his car was washed off a flooded road.

The Australian Bureau of Meteorology reported that the total damage bill was in excess of A$100 million, and an assessment of residential losses by the Queensland Department of Emergency Services ranged from A$26 million to in excess of A$152 million. A detailed analysis in 2005 reported that the total economic cost of the January 1998 floods, after insurance claims, were estimated at A$123.2 million.

As the city began to return to normality, the Townsville Bulletin published a special pull-out supplement and the Ten Network local affiliate produced a television documentary called The Flood: January ’98. Local perception grew that the city was lucky to have avoided a greater disaster. Townsville City Council upgraded urban storm drainage, conducted flood studies, and introduced requirements for new housing developments. A risk management study of Townsville, completed in 2009, stated that:

…[floods were an] inconvenience rather than [a] disaster and …[that Townsville was vulnerable to major flooding was] unlikely.

The Townsville community returned to normal operation in a relatively short period after the 1998 flood. Townsville experienced further flooding in 2019 that exceeded the 1998 flood.
