= Hervey Range, Queensland =

Hervey Range
- Suburb
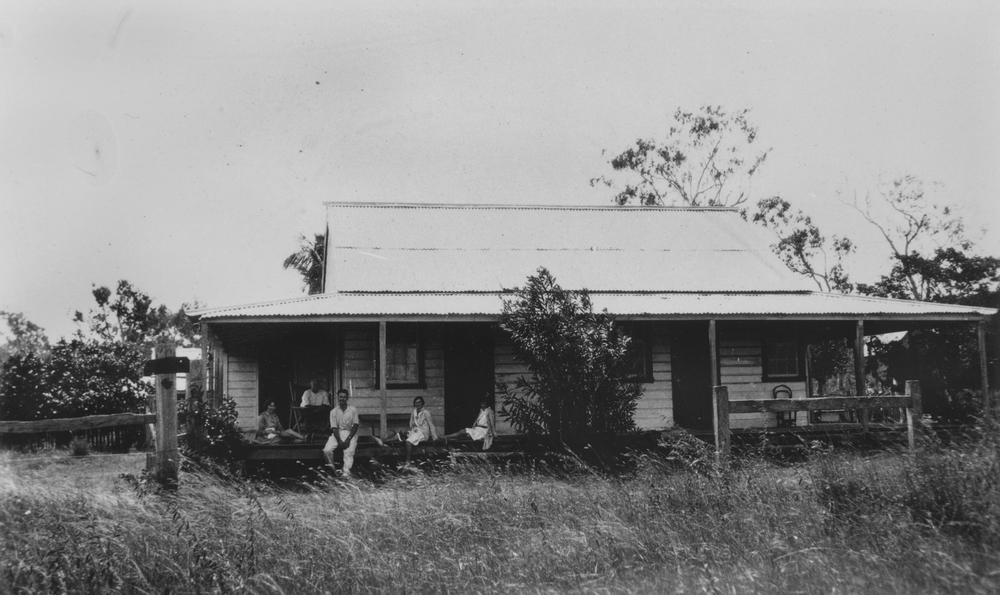
- Hervey's Range Hotel, circa 1930

- Interactive map of Hervey Range
- Coordinates: 19.4457°S 146.4734°E
- Country: Australia
- State: Queensland
- LGAs: City of Townsville; Charters Towers Region
- Location: 35.3 km (21.9 mi) WSW of Kirwan; 37.0 km (23.0 mi) WSW of Townsville CBD; 171 km (106 mi) NE of Charters Towers; 1,386 km (861 mi) NNW of Brisbane

Government
  - State electorates: Hinchinbrook; Traeger
  - Federal divisions: Herbert; Kennedy

Area
  - Total: 108.9 km^{2} (42.0 sq mi)

Population
  - Total: 295 (2021 census)
  - Density: 2.709/km^{2} (7.016/sq mi)
- Time zone: UTC+10:00 (AEST)
Suburbs around Hervey Range
Paluma	Lynam	Black River; Rangewood
Dotswood	Hervey Range	Alice River
Dotswood	Dotswood	Granite Vale

Hervey Range is a rural locality split between the City of Townsville and the Charters Towers Region, Queensland, Australia. In the 2021 census, Hervey Range had a population of 295 people.

== Geography ==
As the name suggests, the locality includes the Hervey mountain range. The split between the two local government areas roughly follows the ridge line with the Townsville City Council responsible for the coastal (eastern) side of the locality and Charters Towers Regional Council responsible for the inland (western) side of the locality. Apart from the ridge itself, the land on the Townsville side is generally much lower (50–100 metres above sea level) compared with the higher land on the Charters Towers side (550–600 metres about sea level).

The now-closed Greenvale railway line passes through the locality with three tunnels and the now-abandoned Kadara railway station (19.3639°S 146.4362°E).

The Hervey Range Developmental Road enters the locality from the north-east (Black River) and exits to the west (Dotswood).

Part of the east of the locality is within the Pinnacles National Park which extends into neighbouring Granite Vale to the south-east.

The land in the north of the locality is mostly used for grazing on native vegetation, while the southern part of the locality is mostly unused land.

== History ==
The mountain range and the locality were both named in 1861 by Phillip Somers after Matthew Hervey of Dotswood pastoral station. Somers and Hervey were co-owners of Dotswood station and Somers was also a member of Allan Cunningham's expedition. Barringha is the local Aboriginal name for the Hervey Range which is also their name for the Western Silver Wattle.

On 14 May 2022, Australian international cricketer Andrew Symonds died in the locality following a single-vehicle road accident on Hervey Range Road, near the Alice River Bridge.

== Demographics ==
In the 2016 census, Hervey Range had a population of 279 people.

In the 2021 census, Hervey Range had a population of 295 people.

== Heritage listings ==
Hervey Range has a number of heritage-listed sites, including:

- Eureka Hotel, Hervey Range Road^{[38]}
- Range Hotel site, Page Road (old Hervey Range Road)

== Education ==
There are no schools in Hervey Range. The nearest government primary school is The Willows State School in Kirwan to the north-east. The nearest government secondary school is Thuringowa State High School in Condon to the east.

== Amenities ==
The Hervey Range Shooting Complex is a rifle range south of Rifle Range Road with facilities for shooting and archery.

== See also ==
- Herveys Range Heritage Tea Rooms
