= Beach Holm =

- Suburb
- Interactive map of Beach Holm
- Coordinates: 19.2063°S 146.6491°E
- Country: Australia
- State: Queensland
- LGA: City of Townsville
- Location: 10.1 km (6.3 mi) NNW of Deeragun; 11.4 km (7.1 mi) NW of Burdell; 25.1 km (15.6 mi) WNW of Townsville CBD; 1,357 km (843 mi) NNW of Brisbane

Government
  - State electorate: Hinchinbrook
  - Federal division: Herbert

Area
  - Total: 12.1 km^{2} (4.7 sq mi)

Population
  - Total: 35 (2021 census)
  - Density: 2.89/km^{2} (7.49/sq mi)
- Time zone: UTC+10:00 (AEST)
- Postcode: 4818
Suburbs around Beach Holm
Yabulu	Coral Sea	Bushland Beach
Black River	Beach Holm	Mount Low
Black River	Jensen	Deeragun

Beach Holm is a coastal locality in the City of Townsville, Queensland, Australia. In the 2021 census, Beach Holm had a population of 35 people.

== Geography ==
Beach Holm is one of Townsville's northern beach suburbs.

The locality is bounded to the north by the Coral Sea. The Bruce Highway enter the locality from the south-west (Mount Low / Derragun) and then forms the southern boundary of the locality (separating it from Jensen) and then exits to the south-west (the locality of Black River).

The watercourse Black River enters the locality form the south-west (locality of Black Water / Jensen) and forms the south-west boundary of the locality of Beach Holm. The boundary then extends west of the river before the boundary returns to the river and follows the river to its mouth (19.1786°S 146.6517°E) on the Coral Sea. The pocket of land on the west of the Black River is inaccessible directly from the locality east of the river.

The coastal strip is sandy and extends along the coast of most of the neighbouring locality of Bushland Beach. The sandy strip is also called Bushland Beach (19.1884°S 146.6731°E).

There is a small strip of housing along the beach on both sides of Batley Parade (also known as the Esplanade, 19.1808°S 146.6555°E). Apart from that, the rest of the locality is low-lying (mostly near sea level) and swampy. Some of the land can be used for grazing on native vegetation but other uses are unused.

There are few streets in the locality and no access directly from the Bruce Highway. The only road access is via Mount Low on an unnamed road (19.1873°S 146.6586°E) off Brabon Road.

The North Coast railway line passes through the south of the locality from the localities of Mount Low to Black River, travelling just north of the Bruce Highway. Kulburn railway station is an abandoned station on that line (19.2266°S 146.6381°E).

== Demographics ==
In the 2016 census Beach Holm had a population of 32 people.

In the 2021 census, Beach Holm had a population of 35 people.

== Education ==
There are no schools in Beach Holm. The nearest government primary schools are North Shore State School and Bohlevale State School, both of which are in Burdell to the south-east. The nearest government secondary school is Northern Beaches State High School in neighbouring Deeragun to the south-east.

== Attractions ==
Brabon Park Cenotaph is a war memorial at 21 Batley Parade (19.1812°S 146.6570°E). Anzac Day services are held at the cenotaph.
