= Bohle River =

Bohle
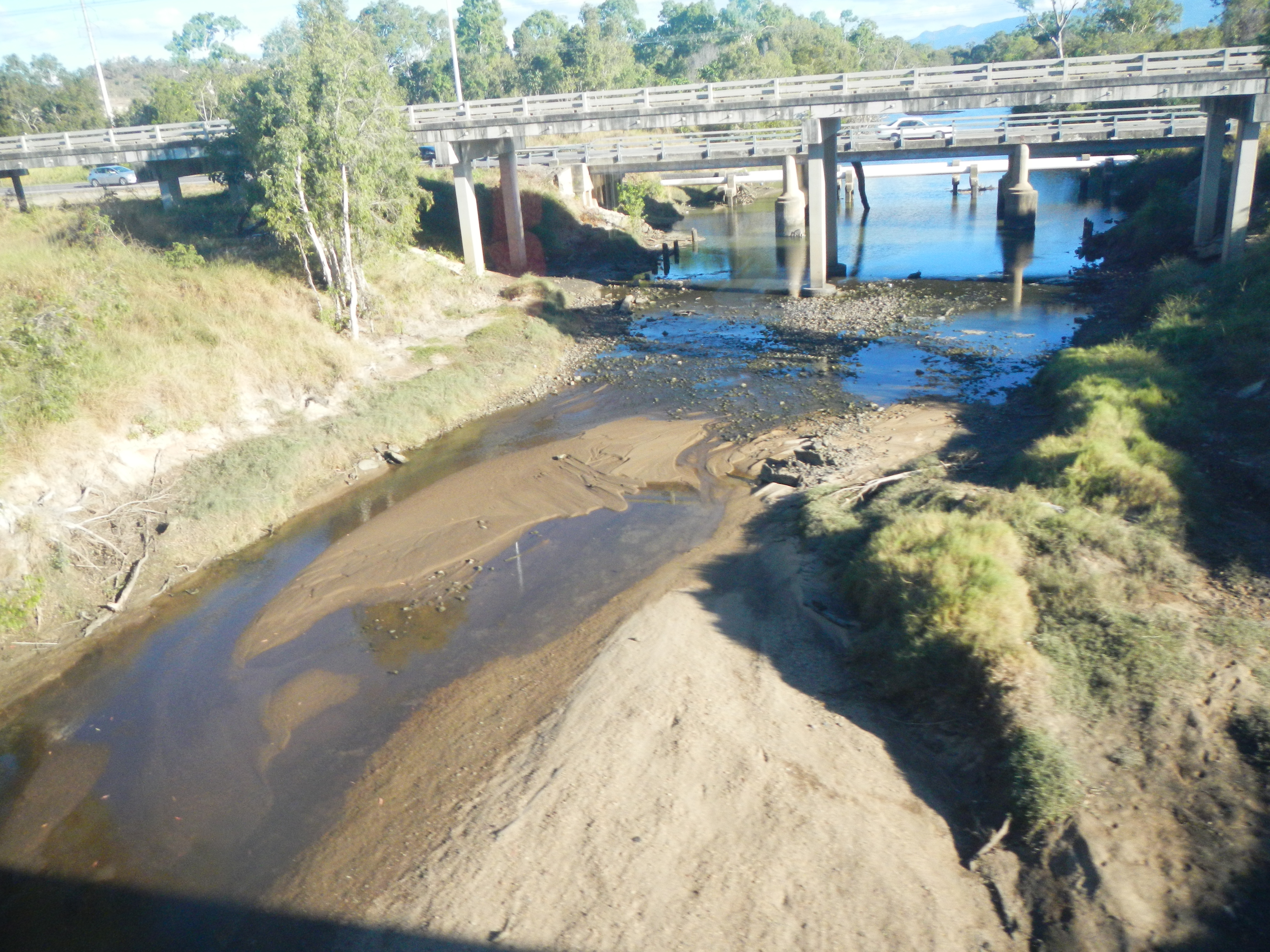
- Bruce Highway crossing the Bohle River at Burdell, 2015

- Location of Bohle River mouth in Queensland
- Etymology: drover Henry Mackinnon Bohle

Location
- Country: Australia
- State: Queensland
- Region: North Queensland

Physical characteristics
- Source: Hervey Range
  - elevation: 76 m (249 ft)
- Mouth: Halifax Bay, Coral Sea
  - location: near Bushland Beach
  - coordinates: 19°11′01″S 146°41′57″E
  - elevation: 1 m (3 ft 3 in)
- Length: 37 km (23 mi)
- Basin size: 368 km^{2} (142 sq mi) to 242.1 km^{2} (93.5 sq mi)
- Discharge
  - location: Near mouth
  - average: 2.9 m^{3}/s (92 GL/a)

The Bohle River is a river in North Queensland, Australia.

== Course and features ==
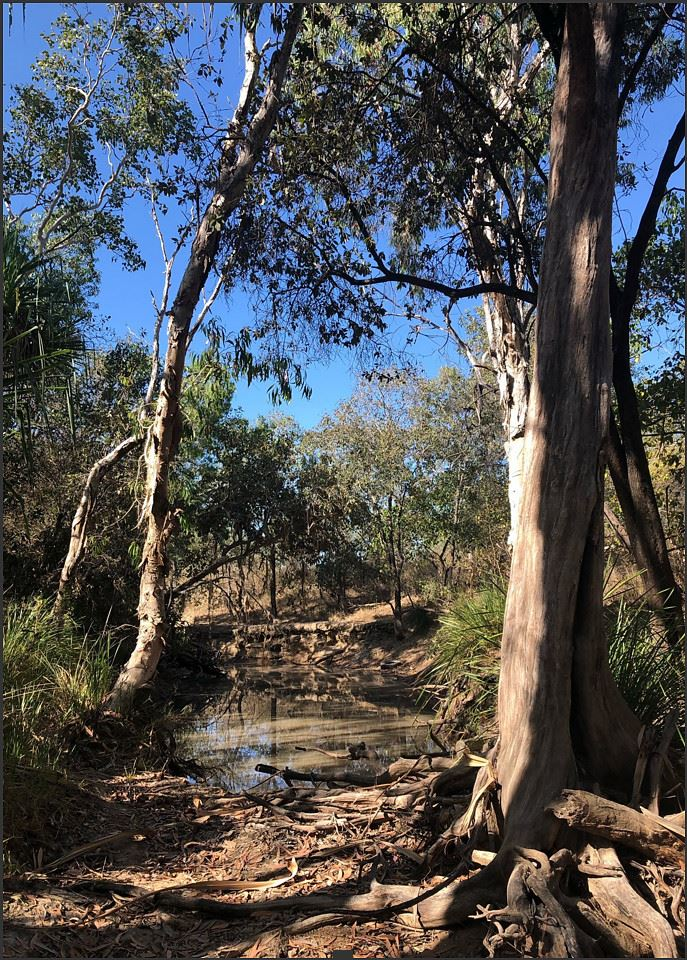
A turbid waterhole sustaining fish populations in the Bohle River, 2022

The headwaters of the river rise in the Hervey Range south of Townsville and flows north along the coastal plain west of Lake Ross and then north, parallel with Ross River. The Hervey Range Developmental Road crosses the river east of Thuringowa and then the Ingham Connection Road crosses the river west of Townsville. It then enters the Bohle River Fish Habitat Area and the Townsville Town Common Conservation Park and discharges into the Halifax Bay near Bushland Beach, and then empties into the Coral Sea. Tributaries include Middle Creek, Stony Creek (19.2035°S 146.7035°E), Stag Creek, the Little Bohle River and Garner Creek. The river descends 75 metres (246 ft) over its 37-kilometre (23 mi) course.

The catchment area of the river occupies 368 square kilometres (142 sq mi) of which an area of 26 square kilometres (10 sq mi) is composed of estuarine wetlands. The river drains most of the coastal plain west of Townsville.

The river supports recreational fishing, particularly of barramundi. The Bohle is located approximately 10 kilometres (6 mi) west of Townsville. Popular for river fishing, the Bohle River is also good for collecting bait. Yabbies are found from time to time in the muddy banks. Typical fish species found in the river are barramundi, red bream, mangrove jack and grunter.

The rivers is named after the drover Henry Mackinnon Bohle who worked for a pioneer of the area John Melton Black. Bohle overlanded a mob of cattle to Fanning Downs in 1863 and moved stock to the Cleveland Bay area in 1864 for Black.

== See also ==
- List of rivers of Australia § Queensland
