= Bohle Plains, Queensland =

Bohle Plains Townsville, Queensland
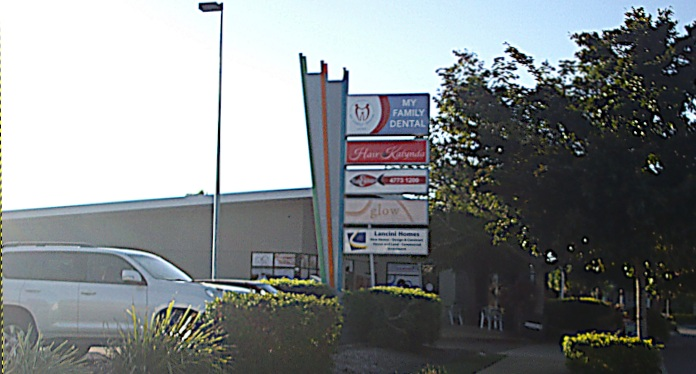
- Kalynda Parade, Bohle Plains

- Coordinates: 19.2952°S 146.6741°E
- Population: 3,989 (2021 census)
  - Density: 126.23/km^{2} (326.9/sq mi)
- Postcode(s): 4817
- Area: 31.6 km^{2} (12.2 sq mi)
- Time zone: AEST (UTC+10:00)
- Location: 17.7 km (11 mi) WSW of Townsville CBD; 1,362 km (846 mi) NNW of Brisbane
- LGA(s): City of Townsville
- State electorate(s): Hinchinbrook; Thuringowa
- Federal division(s): Herbert
Suburbs around Bohle Plains:
Jensen	Deeragun	Shaw
Rangewood	Bohle Plains	Kirwan
Alice River	Gumlow	Condon

Bohle Plains is a locality in Townsville in the City of Townsville, Queensland, Australia. In the 2021 census, Bohle Plains had a population of 3,989 people.

== History ==
Bohle Plains is situated in the traditional Wulgurukaba Aboriginal country.

The name Bohle Plains comes from the nearby Bohle River, which in turn takes its name from Henry Mackinnon Bohle, who brought cattle to the area in 1863.

== Geography ==
The Hervey Range Developmental Road runs through from south-east to south-west, passing under and linking to the Bruce Highway, which runs through from south-east to north-west. Shaw Road exits to the east.

== Demographics ==
In the 2016 census Bohle Plains had a population of 3,205 people.

In the 2021 census, Bohle Plains had a population of 3,989 people.

== Education ==
There are no schools in Bohle Plains. The nearest government primary schools are The Willows State School in neighbouring Kirwan to the east and Bohlevale State School in neighbouring Burdell to the north. The nearest government secondary schools are Thuringowa State High School in neighbouring Condon to the south-east, Kirwan State High School in Kirwan, and Northern Beaches State High School in Deeragun.

== Amenities ==
There are a number of parks in the area:

- Mannikin Way Park (19.3117°S 146.6889°E)
- Needletail Way Park (19.3122°S 146.6931°E)
