= Jensen, Queensland =

Jensen Townsville, Queensland
- Coordinates: 19.2572°S 146.6408°E
- Population: 1,797 (2021 census)
  - Density: 120.6/km^{2} (312.4/sq mi)
- Postcode(s): 4818
- Area: 14.9 km^{2} (5.8 sq mi)
- Time zone: AEST (UTC+10:00)
- Location: 19.6 km (12 mi) W of Townsville CBD; 1,499 km (931 mi) NNW of Brisbane
- LGA(s): City of Townsville
- State electorate(s): Hinchinbrook
- Federal division(s): Herbert
Suburbs around Jensen:
Black River	Beach Holm	Mount Low
Black River	Jensen	Deeragun
Black River	Rangewood	Bohle Plains

Jensen is a suburb in the City of Townsville, Queensland, Australia. In the 2021 census, Jensen had a population of 1,797 people.

== Geography ==
Jensen is bounded by the Bruce Highway to the north and the Black River and Alice River to the west.

== History ==
The locality was officially named and bounded on 27 July 1991.

== Demographics ==
In the 2016 census, Jensen had a population of 1,476 people.

In the 2021 census, Jensen had a population of 1,797 people.

== Education ==
There are no schools in Jensen. The nearest government primary school is Bohlevale State School in Burdell to the east. The nearest government secondary school is Northern Beaches State High School in neighbouring Deeragun to the east.

== Facilities ==
Deeragun Police Station is at 3 Veales Road (corner of Bruce Highway, 19.2350°S 146.6536°E).

== Amenities ==
Colonial Park is in Macquarie Street (19.2481°S 146.6483°E).
