= Rosebank, Townsville =

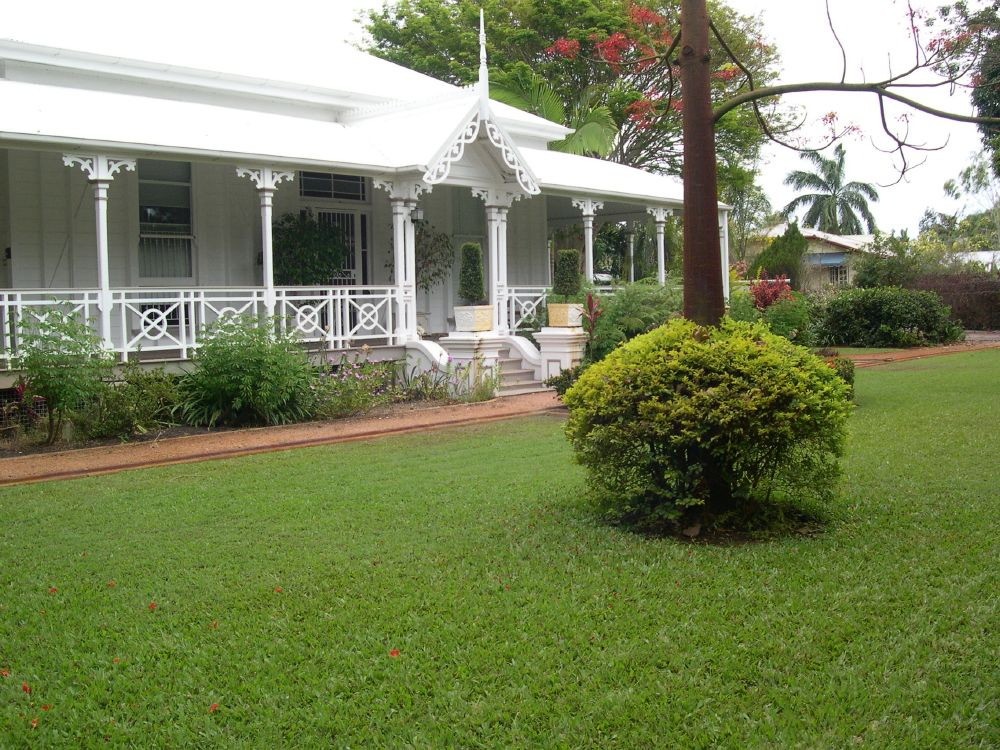
- Rosebank, 2015

- Location within Queensland Location within Australia
- 19.2897°S 146.7914°E
- Location: 21 Lawson Street, Mysterton, City of Townsville, Queensland, Australia

History
- Design period: 1870s–1890s (late 19th century)
- Built: c. 1885

Queensland Heritage Register
- Official name: Rosebank
- Type: state heritage (landscape, built)
- Designated: 21 October 1992
- Reference no.: 600877
- Significant period: 1880s–1920s (historical); 1880s–1910s (fabric)
- Significant components: kitchen/kitchen house, trees/plantings, garden/grounds, residential accommodation – main house

Rosebank is a heritage-listed detached house at 21 Lawson Street, Mysterton, City of Townsville, Queensland, Australia. It was built in 1886. It was added to the Queensland Heritage Register on 21 October 1992.

== History ==
Rosebank, a substantial, single-storeyed timber residence, was erected c. 1885 for well-known Townsville identities Rose and Andrew Ball.

Andrew Ball was one of the first Europeans to explore the Cleveland Bay district, and is acknowledged as the founder of Townsville. In 1864 he was managing Woodstock Station (to the south of Ross River) for pastoralists Robert Towns and John Melton Black (who together owned Jarvisfield and Woodstock cattle runs and Fanning Downs and Victoria Downs sheep stations), when Black asked Ball to explore the country to the north, to find a suitable wharfage site at Cleveland Bay from which to handle station produce. Ball, accompanied by Mark Watt Reid and two Aboriginal stockmen, set out in April 1864 and eventually found the mouth of what later was called the Ross River. The site Ball selected for a wharf and port was on Ross Creek, a tributary of Ross River. Lying beneath the huge sandstone outcrop of Castle Hill, the location reminded Ball of Castletown, the capital of the Isle of Man, and that was what he called the place. When a government town site was surveyed here in 1865, the name was changed officially from Castletown to Townsville, in honour of Robert Towns.

Andrew Ball was occupied for the next few years with pastoral work before returning to Townsville in the late 1860s, and was a partner in Ball & Grimaldi, Townsville, in 1869. In 1877 he married Mrs Rose O'Neill, widow and licensee of the Exchange Hotel in Flinders Street since 1873. The Exchange had been erected in 1869 by Edward Head and was made the terminus for the Ravenswood coach service in 1870, but it was the popular Rose O'Neill who improved the hotel's reputation and nearly doubled its size in the mid-1870s. Rose O'Neill eventually purchased the hotel and following her marriage to Andrew Ball and his taking over of the licence in 1877, the Exchange became one of the most popular hotels in town. Ball was charming and widely known, with business interests both in Townsville and on the goldfields (Ravenswood and Charters Towers), and together, he and Rose developed a large and loyal cliental at the Exchange. In 1881 the two-storeyed timber hotel was destroyed by fire, but Townsville was booming and Ball immediately rebuilt in brick, the substantial new two-storeyed Exchange Hotel opening in 1882. That year Andrew Ball gave up the licence, he and Rose retiring from hotel work but retaining numerous Townsville business interests. They resided at West End for some years before moving to Rosebank in the mid-1880s.

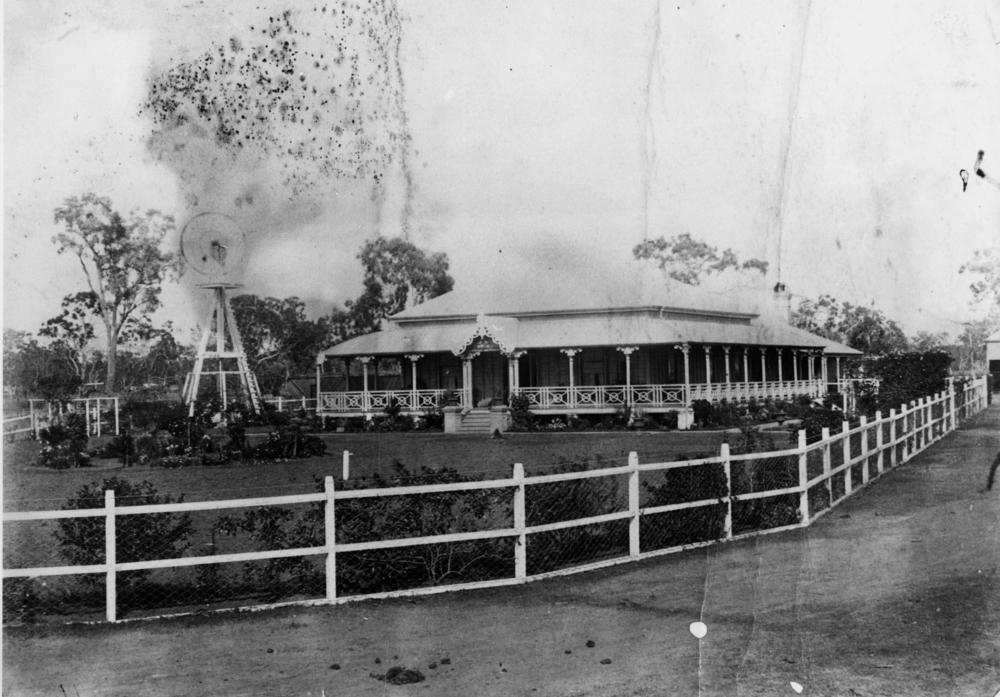
Rosebank, circa 1892

In January 1885 Rose Ball acquired title to a 20-acre (8.1 ha) site about 3 miles (4.8 km) out of town, southwest along the Charters Towers road, at a time when the western and southwestern suburbs of Townsville were emerging as fashionable addresses for successful Townsville businesspersons. On this property Rose and Andrew Ball erected Rosebank, a large timber residence picturesquely situated overlooking a small lagoon and creek (now filled in and part of Mindham Park). The front entrance drive from the main road crossed a causeway and two bridges over the creek/lagoon, then became a circular drive lined by bunya pines and mango trees, surrounding a large rose garden in the front yard. The back approach to the house passed through banyan and Moreton Bay fig trees. Rosebank was developed as a self-sufficient semi-rural estate, with a dairy, cowyard, chicken run, vegetable garden, stables and various storage and fodder sheds, and an underground water supply. Rose Ball also developed a very fine flower garden and bush house at Rosebank, which were famous in the Townsville district. Andrew Ball died at Rosebank in September 1894, aged 62, and his widow remained there until her death in February 1925, aged 83. In January 1912 their only daughter, Annie Alice May, married lawyer Robert Johnstone Douglas (son of Queensland Premier, John Douglas), later a Supreme Court Judge. Mr & Mrs Douglas are understood to have resided at Rosebank from 1912, when they employed Townsville builder E Crowder to renovate the building. The renovations included the installation of a number of pressed metal ceilings, removal of a partition wall to form a library, enlargement of the dining room by opening up the sewing room and pantry, and extension of the kitchen. The verandah floorboards also were replaced at this time. In 1919, title to the property was transferred from Mrs Ball to her daughter.

In 1903 and again in 1971 the house was damaged by cyclones and the owners carried out major alterations and refurbishment to parts of the structure in 1912 and 1972. Blocks of land on the left side of the house were sold off in the first part of this century and in 1940 the local Council resumed the watercourse in front of Rosebank to create public parkland, reducing the 8.094 hectare property to the house block of today.

The Douglas family, one of whom became a leading physician in Townsville, owned the house until September, 1972 when it was purchased by the Lillicrap family who undertook renovations to make it more functional. The Lillicrap family, after many years sold the house to the family that still owns it.

== Description ==
Rosebank is a substantial, single-storeyed, timber house resting on low brick piers, with a short-ridge roof of corrugated-iron, wide surrounding verandahs and a detached kitchen wing at the rear, accessed from the back verandah. The single-skinned external walls have deep chamferboards with exposed stud-framing. Decorative details include cast-iron cresting and finials on the roof, cross-braced timber balustrading and ornate timber brackets on the verandahs, and a finial and fretwork bargeboards to the small gabled entrance portico at the front. The interior has some fine pressed metal ceilings, which have been restored, and early 20th century light fittings. The kitchen and bathroom of the service wing have been modernised. A double brick garage and pool at the left of the house are late 20th century additions. While some of the c. 1885 mango trees remain, more recent cottage gardens have been established.

The house is fronted by Townsville City Council parkland which was part of the original property.

== Heritage listing ==
Rosebank was listed on the Queensland Heritage Register on 21 October 1992 having satisfied the following criteria.

The place is important in demonstrating the evolution or pattern of Queensland's history.

Rosebank, erected c. 1885, survives as important evidence of the development of Townsville as the principal port of north Queensland in the 1880s, when businesses were consolidating, the principal commercial premises were being re-built in brick, and fine gentlemen's residences were being established in the western and southwestern suburbs. Its imposing style reflects the prosperity of its owners and of the region during the boom period of the 1880s.

Renovations in the 1910s and 1970s testify to its continued use as an elite residence for well over a century.

The place is important in demonstrating the principal characteristics of a particular class of cultural places.

Rosebank is an excellent example of a substantial, decorative, timber residence of the mid-1880s, complete with detached kitchen house, standing in the remnants of larger grounds and garden

The place is important because of its aesthetic significance.

The house remains highly intact, and together with the surviving grounds, is important for its aesthetic qualities.

The place has a strong or special association with a particular community or cultural group for social, cultural or spiritual reasons.

Rosebank is considered one of Townsville's finest colonial homes, and has a strong association for the residents of Townsville with the early development of their city.

The place has a special association with the life or work of a particular person, group or organisation of importance in Queensland's history.

It is important also for its close association with Andrew and Rose Ball, prominent and early Townsville residents, Andrew Ball being acknowledged as the founder of Townsville.
