= Alice River =

Alice River may refer to:

- The following rivers in Queensland, Australia:
  - Alice River (Barcoo River), a tributary of Barcoo River
  - Alice River (Black River), a tributary of Black River (Queensland)
  - Alice River (Far North Queensland), a tributary of Mitchell River (Queensland)
- The following settlements in Queensland, Australia:
  - Alice River, Queensland
