= Black River, Queensland =

Black River
- Suburb
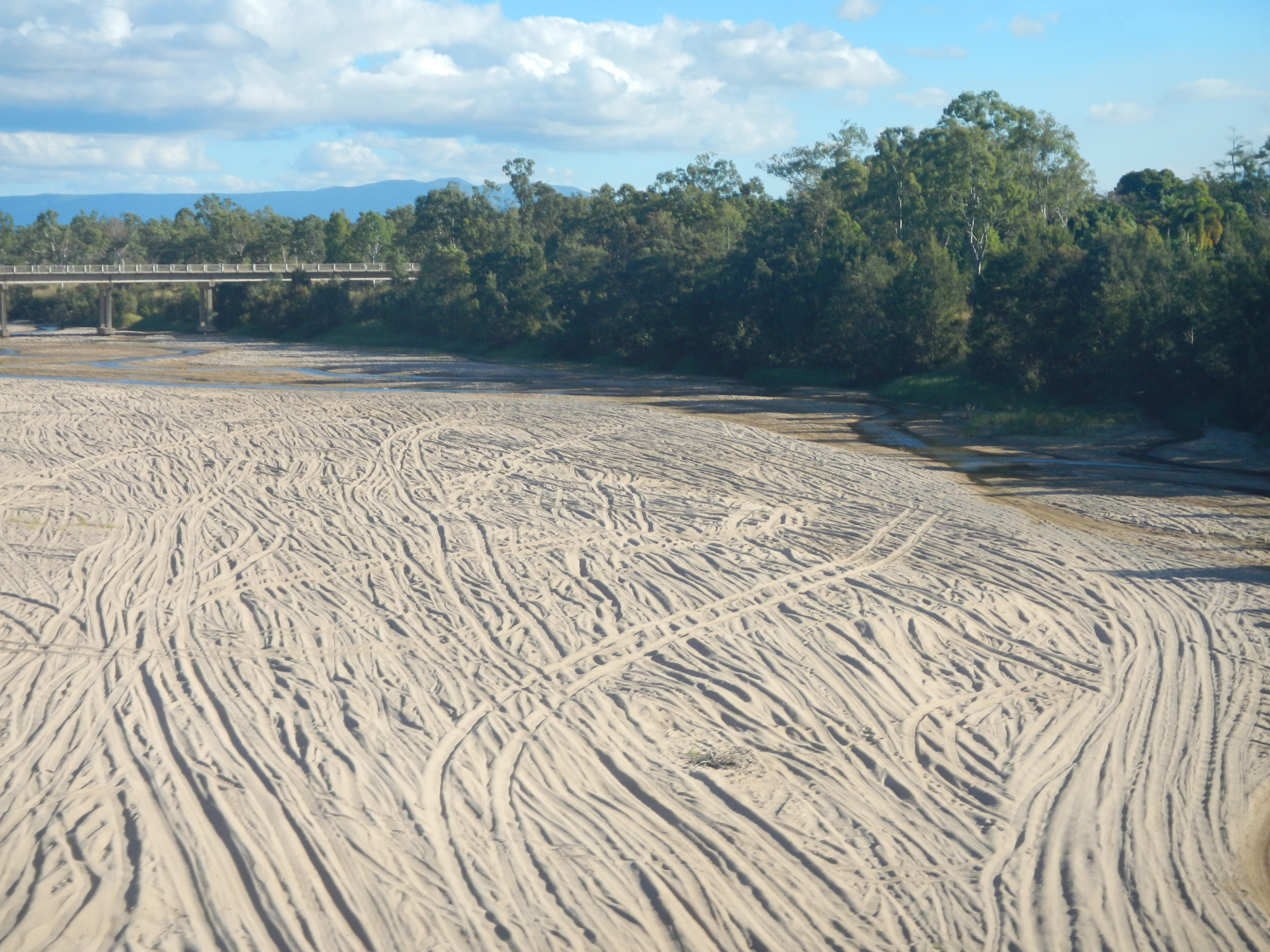
- Black River, flowing through the suburb, 2013

- Interactive map of Black River
- Coordinates: 19.2616°S 146.5986°E
- Country: Australia
- State: Queensland
- City: Townsville
- LGA: City of Townsville
- Location: 23.8 km (14.8 mi) W of Townsville CBD; 1,382 km (859 mi) NNW of Brisbane

Government
  - State electorate: Hinchinbrook
  - Federal division: Herbert

Area
  - Total: 61.2 km^{2} (23.6 sq mi)

Population
  - Total: 1,493 (2021 census)
  - Density: 24.395/km^{2} (63.18/sq mi)
- Time zone: UTC+10:00 (AEST)
- Postcode: 4818
Suburbs around Black River
Bluewater	Yabulu	Beach Holm
Lynam	Black River	Jensen
Hervey Range	Alice River	Rangewood

Black River is a rural western suburb of Townsville in the City of Townsville, Queensland, Australia. In the 2021 census, Black River had a population of 1,493 people.

== Geography ==
The now-closed Greenvale railway line passed through the locality; there were no stations within the locality.

The Hervey Range Developmental Road runs along the southern boundary.

== History ==
The suburb is named after the Black River which was in turn named after John Melton Black (1830–1919) who was a pastoralist, merchant and a settler of Townsville.

== Demographics ==
In the 2016 census, Black River had a population of 1,476 people.

In the 2021 census, Black River had a population of 1,493 people.

== Education ==
There are no schools in Black River. The nearest government primary schools are Bohlevale State School in Burdell to the east, Bluewater State School in neighbouring Bluewater to the north-west, and The Williows State School in Kirwan to the south-east. The nearest government secondary schools are Northern Beaches State High School in Deeragun to the east and Thuringowa State High School in Condon to the south-east.
