= Rangewood, Queensland =

Rangewood
- Suburb
- Interactive map of Rangewood
- Coordinates: 19.3011°S 146.6277°E
- Country: Australia
- State: Queensland
- City: Townsville
- LGA: City of Townsville
- Location: 9.8 km (6.1 mi) WNW of Condon; 12.1 km (7.5 mi) W of Kirwan; 24.2 km (15.0 mi) WSW of Townsville CBD; 1,376 km (855 mi) NNW of Brisbane

Government
  - State electorate: Hinchinbrook
  - Federal division: Herbert

Area
  - Total: 21.1 km^{2} (8.1 sq mi)

Population
  - Total: 1,084 (2021 census)
  - Density: 51.37/km^{2} (133.1/sq mi)
- Time zone: UTC+10:00 (AEST)
- Postcode: 4817
Suburbs around Rangewood
| Black River | Jensen | Bohle Plains |
| Black River | Rangewood | Bohle Plains |
| Hervey Range | Alice River | Alice River |

Rangewood is a suburb of Townsville in the City of Townsville, Queensland, Australia. In the 2021 census, Rangewood had a population of 1,084 people.

== Geography ==
The Hervey Range Developmental Road runs along the southern boundary.

The locality is predominantly used for grazing on native vegetation, except for the suburban subdivision in the south-west of the locality.

== History ==
The suburb was named and bounded on 28 February 2003.

== Demographics ==
In the 2016 census, Rangewood had a population of 1,057 people.

In the 2021 census, Rangewood had a population of 1,084 people.

== Education ==
There are no schools in Rangewood. The nearest government primary school is The Willows State School in Kirwan to the east. The nearest government secondary school is Thuringowa State High School in Condon to the south-east.

== Amenities ==
There are a number of parks in the area:

- Mt Margaret Park (19.3143°S 146.6356°E)
- Rangewood Park (19.3030°S 146.6405°E)
