= Rooney Building =

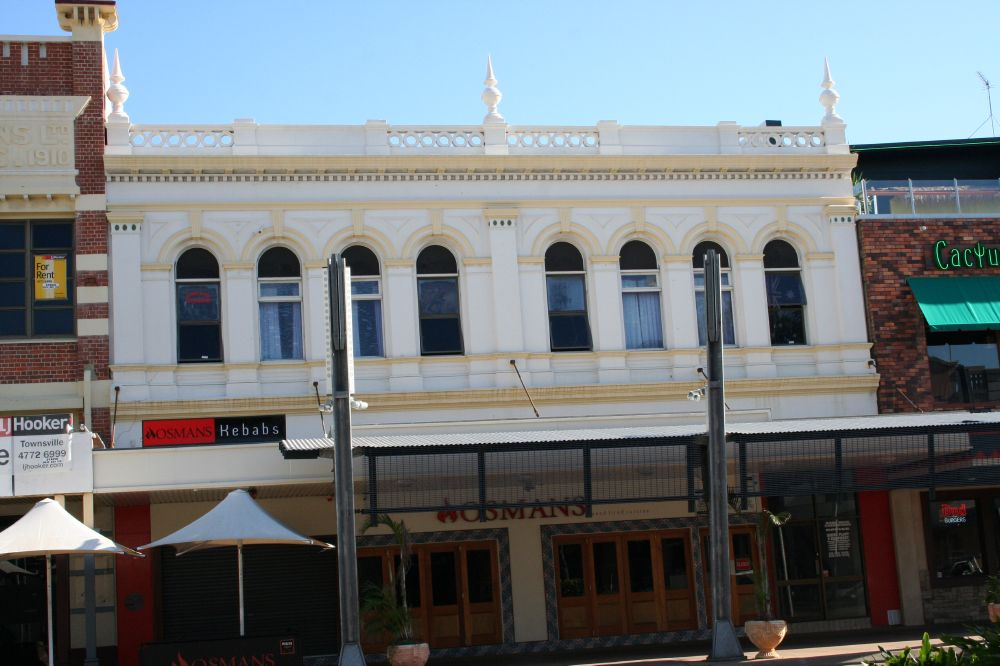
- Rooney Building, 2009

- Location within Queensland Location within Australia
- 19.2576°S 146.8185°E
- Location: 241–245 Flinders Street, Townsville CBD, City of Townsville, Queensland, Australia

History
- Design period: 1870s–1890s (late 19th century)
- Built: 1883
- Built for: Edmund Harris Thornburgh Plant

Site notes
- Architectural style: Classicism

Queensland Heritage Register
- Official name: Rooney Building
- Type: state heritage (built)
- Designated: 21 October 1992
- Reference no.: 600917
- Significant period: 1880s (fabric); 1883–ongoing (historical commercial use)

Rooney Building is a heritage-listed commercial building at 241–245 Flinders Street, Townsville CBD, City of Townsville, Queensland, Australia. It was built in 1883. It was added to the Queensland Heritage Register on 21 October 1992.

== History ==
The building was constructed for Edmund Harris Thornburgh Plant, mill owner, company director of a number of mines in the Charters Towers-Ravenswood area and a Member of the Queensland Legislative Council from 1905 to 1922. After construction in 1883 it was occupied by Pollard's Music Store and by the Royal Bank of Queensland from 1890.

In 1892 Rooney & Co., the leading builders of the region, took out a lease and traded from there for the next 49 years. In 1917 Rooney Ltd purchased the building and in 1928 modernised the ground floor as a large furniture showroom. The produce firm of Samuel Allen & Sons Ltd, established in the city in 1872, purchased the site in 1953. In 1979 the windows on the first floor were replaced with aluminium and the ground floor facade altered to accommodate three shops or restaurants.

In 2016, an Italian restaurant is operating from the ground floor.

== Description ==
The Rooney Building, constructed in 1883, has a plain symmetrical facade with some classical features such as arched windows and a decorative parapet which conceals the corrugated iron roof. The ground floor facade of this cement-rendered brick building has been altered and the original awning replaced with one of a modern cantilever design. This floor is now divided into three shops. Aluminium windows have replaced the timber framed windows on the upper level while the interior of the first floor has been renovated to house offices.

== Heritage listing ==
Rooney Building was listed on the Queensland Heritage Register on 21 October 1992 having satisfied the following criteria.

The place is important in demonstrating the evolution or pattern of Queensland's history.

Its importance is enhanced because of the contribution these commercial firms made to the development and consolidation of Townsville in the 1880s.

The place is important in demonstrating the principal characteristics of a particular class of cultural places.

While this building is representative of commercial structures of the period, it is also important as a unifying part of the Flinders Street East area.

The place is important because of its aesthetic significance.

While this building is representative of commercial structures of the period, it is also important as a unifying part of the Flinders Street East area.

The place has a special association with the life or work of a particular person, group or organisation of importance in Queensland's history.

The long association of a leading building firm with the structure, together with its construction for a prominent commercial and political figure and its later purchase by a longstanding produce firm makes this building significant.
