= Joseph Hodel =

The Honourable Joseph Hodel
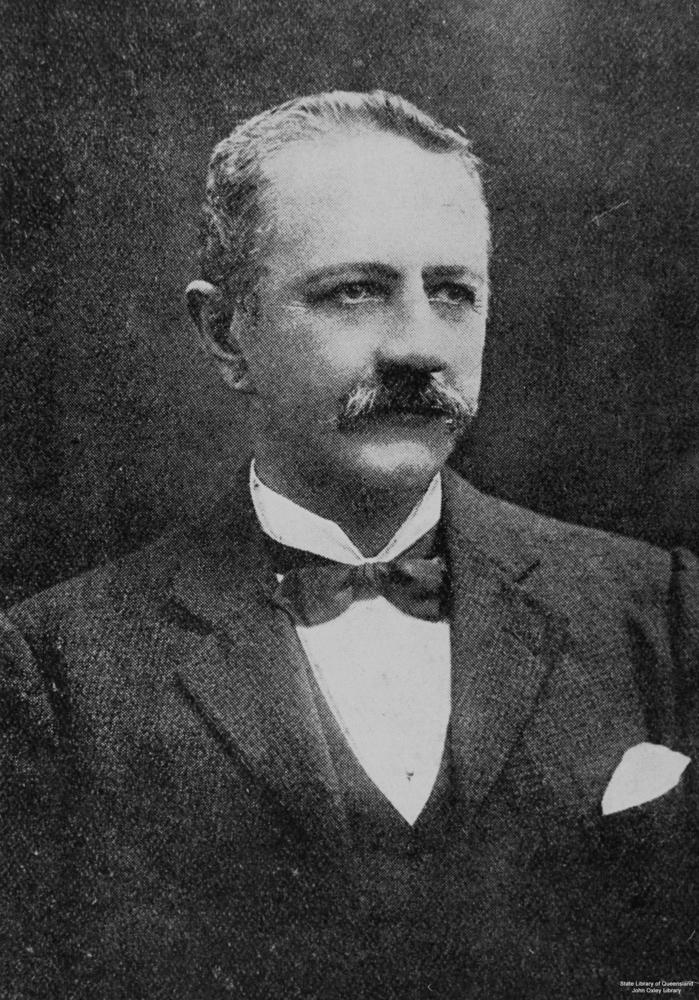

Member of the Queensland Legislative Council
- In office 3 July 1914 – 23 March 1922

Personal details
- Born: Joseph Hodel; 9 October 1850 Saint Helier, Jersey, Channel Islands
- Died: 4 September 1943 (aged 92) Townsville, Queensland, Australia
- Spouse(s): Johanna Hickey (d. 1869 d. 1876), Sarah Ann Waldie (m. 1891)
- Relations: Edmund Plant (brother-in-law)
- Occupation: Bakery proprietor, livery stable proprietor, publican

Joseph Hodel (1850–1943) was a businessman and politician in Queensland, Australia.

== Early life ==
Joseph Hodel was born on 9 October 1850 at St Helier, Jersey, Channel Islands. His parents were François Charles Hodel (a carpenter) and his wife Anne (née Fauvel). His parents and their ten children immigrated to Brisbane, Queensland, from where they went to work for Robert Towns at his Townsvale plantation (between Veresdale and Gleneagle). He opened a bakery in Townsville in 1870.

== Political life ==
For 23 years between 1884 and 1922, Joseph Hodel was a council member of the Thuringowa Divisional Board and its successor the Shire of Thuringowa and served as chairman on 14 occasions.

He was a member of the Townsville City Council from 1895 and was mayor in 1910.

Joseph Hodel was a Member of the Queensland Legislative Council (a life appointment) from 3 July 1914 to the abolition of the council on 23 March 1922.
