= Edmund Plant =

Australian politician (1844–1926)

The Hon Edmund Plant
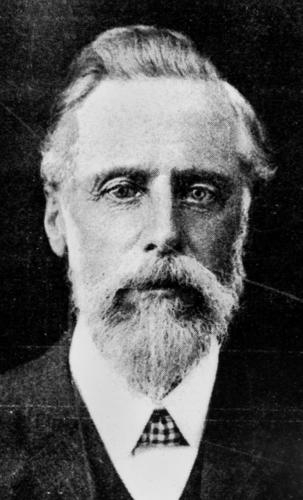

Member of the Queensland Legislative Council
- In office 8 June 1905 – 23 March 1922

Personal details
- Born: Edmund Harris Thornburgh Plant; 10 December 1844 Nottingham, England
- Died: 28 April 1926 (aged 81) Sandgate, Queensland, Australia
- Resting place: Bald Hills Cemetery
- Spouse: Elizabeth Esther Hodel (m.1873 d.1925)
- Relations: Joseph Hodel (brother-in-law)
- Occupation: Newspaper proprietor, company director

Edmund Harris Thornburgh Plant (10 December 1844 – 28 April 1926) was a mill owner and company director of mines in the Charters Towers-Ravenswood and a politician in Queensland, Australia.

== Early life ==
Edmund Harris Thornburgh Plant was born on 10 December 1844 in Nottingham, England, the son of C. Frederick Plant and his wife Maria (née Neville).

== Politics ==
Plant was appointed a member of the Queensland Legislative Council on 8 June 1905. A lifetime appointment, he remained in the council until its abolition on 23 March 1922.

== Later life ==
Plant died on 28 April 1926 at Sandgate and was buried in Bald Hills Cemetery.

== Legacy ==
The Rooney Building which he constructed in Townsville is now listed on the Queensland Heritage Register.
