= Black River (Queensland) =

Black
- Location of Black River mouth in Queensland
- Etymology: John Melton Black

Location
- Country: Australia
- State: Queensland
- Region: North Queensland

Physical characteristics
- Source: Great Dividing Range
  - location: west of Mount Cataract
  - coordinates: 19°17′09″S 146°25′29″E
  - elevation: 84 m (276 ft)
- Mouth: Coral Sea
  - location: Bushland Beach
  - coordinates: 19°10′48″S 146°39′06″E
  - elevation: 0 m (0 ft)
- Length: 33 km (21 mi)
- Basin size: 306.7 km^{2} (118.4 sq mi)
- Discharge
  - location: Near mouth
  - average: 3.7 m^{3}/s (120 GL/a)

The Black River is a river in North Queensland, Australia.

The headwaters of the river rise near Ben Lomond East in the Great Dividing Range and flow in a northeasterly direction. The river flows roughly parallel with the Hervey Range Developmental Road past Mount Cataract and Mount Black on the Bohle Plains. The river is crossed by the Bruce Highway near Kulburr and discharges into the Coral Sea between Yabulu and Beach Holm approximately 10 kilometres (6 mi) north west of Townsville.

The river descends 84 metres (276 ft) over its 33-kilometre (21 mi) course. The catchment area occupies 1,060 square kilometres (409 sq mi), including 36 square kilometres (14 sq mi) of riverine wetlands and 10.6 square kilometres (4 sq mi) of estuarine wetlands.

A total of 22 species of fish have been found in the river, including the glassfish, Roman nose goby, fly-specked hardyhead, golden gudgeon, jungle perch, barramundi, oxeye herring, eastern rainbowfish, spotted scat, and crescent perch.

The river is named after John Melton Black, who was a pastoralist, merchant and a settler of Townsville. The outer Townsville suburb of Black River is named after the river which flows through northern side of the area.

The Alice River is a tributary of the Black River with a confluence at 19°15′00″S 146°37′59″E. The river is the western boundary of the Townsville suburb of Alice River.

== See also ==
- List of rivers of Australia § Queensland
- 1998 Townsville floods
