= Herveys Range Heritage Tea Rooms =

Historical cafe in North Queensland, Australia

Coordinates: 19°21′08.09″S 146°27′15.43″E

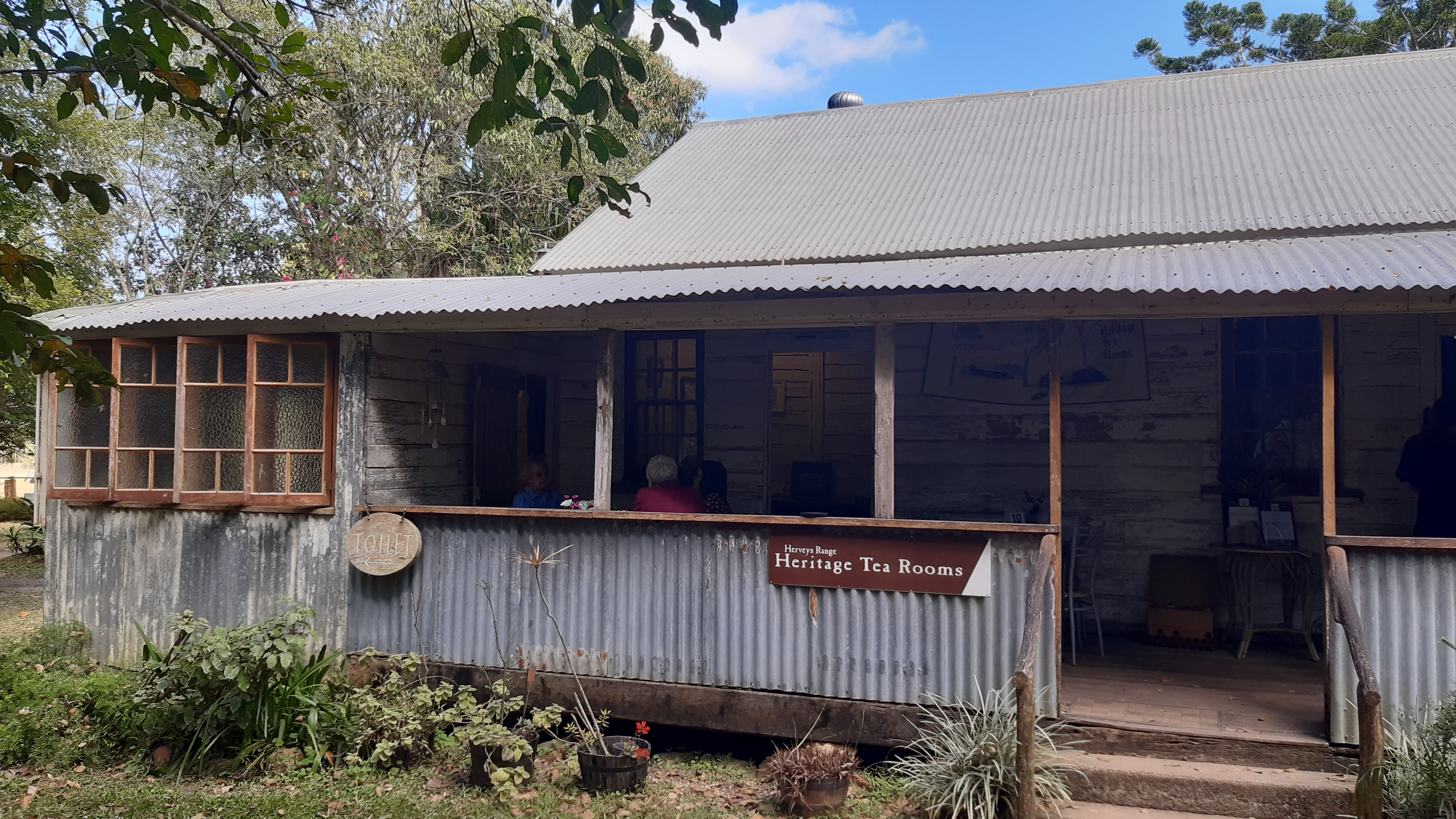
The tea rooms in 2025

The Herveys Range Heritage Tea Rooms are a historical café located at the top of the Hervey Range, approximately 32 kilometres (20 mi) north-west of Townsville in North Queensland, Australia.

== North Queensland's oldest building ==
The Heritage Tea Rooms are situated inside the former Eureka Hotel, built in 1865 and one of the last slab-sided inns in north Queensland. The Eureka Hotel is a rare example of bush carpentry, and is heritage listed because of this. It is also the oldest standing wooden building in north Queensland.

It is located on top of the Hervey range west of Townsville, on a range between the goldfields and the port, and was built a year after the town was settled.

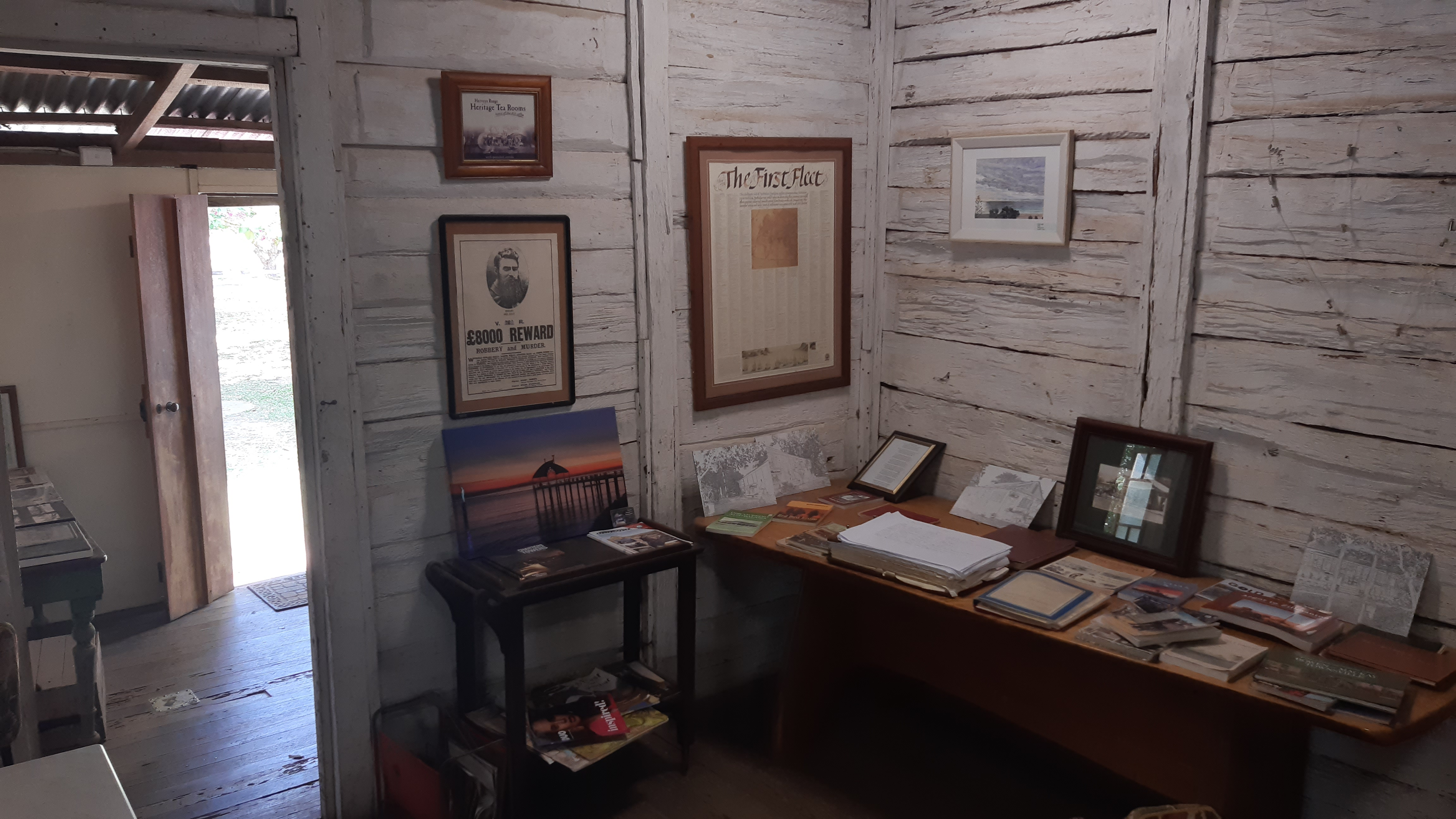
Interior of the tea rooms

== Attractions ==
The Tea Rooms are a café known for all day breakfast and a variety of tea. They also have other attractions including:

- The surrounding gardens
- Historic items
- Close proximity to the Herveys Range scenic drive, with direct road access to Charters Towers and the Atherton Tablelands

== In the media ==
On 1 July 2007, the Australian Channel Seven show Border Security: Australia's Front Line ran a story on kopi luwak being imported into Australia. Customs officials decided after much deliberation that the rare coffee would pose no threat to the Australian agricultural industry, and approved the importation. For many viewers, this was the first they had ever heard of kopi luwak.

The next day on 2 July, the Channel Seven breakfast chat show Sunrise based their morning weather presentations from the Heritage Tea Rooms. Weather presenter Monique Wright confirmed during this episode of Sunrise that the Heritage Tea Room was in fact linked to the Border Security story on the importation of the kopi luwak.
