= Mount Low, Queensland =

Mount Low Townsville, Queensland
- Coordinates: 19.2247°S 146.6808°E
- Population: 5,488 (2021 census)
  - Density: 481.4/km^{2} (1,247/sq mi)
- Postcode(s): 4818
- Area: 11.4 km^{2} (4.4 sq mi)
- Time zone: AEST (UTC+10:00)
- Location: 18.9 km (12 mi) WNW of Townsville CBD; 1,350 km (839 mi) NNW of Brisbane
- LGA(s): City of Townsville
- State electorate(s): Hinchinbrook
- Federal division(s): Herbert
Suburbs around Mount Low:
| Beach Holm | Bushland Beach | Burdell |
| Beach Holm | Mount Low | Burdell |
| Jensen | Deeragun | Deeragun |

Mount Low is a suburb of Townsville in the City of Townsville, Queensland, Australia. In the 2021 census, Mount Low had a population of 5,488 people.

== Geography ==
The Bruce Highway and the Great Northern Railway form the southern boundary of the suburb. Deeragun railway station serves the suburb (19.2452°S 146.6771°E).

North Townsville Road runs along part of the southern boundary.

== History ==
The area was named 27 July 1991, presumably named after the mountain Mount Low, which rises 54 metres (177 ft) above sea level (19.2081°S 146.6827°E), just north of the suburb in neighbouring Bushland Beach. On 28 February 2003, it was officially made a suburb.

In 2008, the Maidment Development Group had a residential development for 1300 houses approved.

== Demographics ==
In the 2016 census, Mount Low had a population of 4,655 people.

In the 2021 census, Mount Low had a population of 5,488 people.

== Education ==
There are no schools in Mount Low. The nearest government primary schools are Bohlevale State School and North Shore State School, both in neighbouring Burdell to the east. The nearest government secondary school is Northern Beaches State High School in neighbouring Deeragun to the south.

== Amenities ==
There are a number of parks in the area.

Kilcora Park in Kilcora Street (19.2349°S 146.6744°E) has a half basketball court.

Sanctum Park on Sanctum Boulevard (19.2185°S 146.6578°E) has outdoor exercise equipment, playground equipment and a dog park.
