= Eureka Hotel =

- Location within Queensland Location within Australia
- 19.3553°S 146.4534°E
- Location: Hervey Range Road, Hervey Range, Charters Towers Region, Queensland, Australia

History
- Design period: 1840s–1860s (mid-19th century)
- Built: c. 1865

Queensland Heritage Register
- Official name: Eureka Hotel (former)
- Type: state heritage (built)
- Designated: 21 October 1992
- Reference no.: 600923
- Significant period: 1860s (fabric); 1865–1908 (historical)
- Significant components: shed/s, stockyards

Eureka Hotel is a heritage-listed hotel at Hervey Range Road, Hervey Range, Charters Towers Region, Queensland, Australia. It was built c. 1865. It was added to the Queensland Heritage Register on 21 October 1992.

== History ==
The first recorded licensee, Charles Saville Rowe, was operating from the hotel in 1865. It was built at the top of Thorntons Gap on Herveys Range to accommodate travellers moving down to the plains at Townsville and up to the new gold fields and pastoral leases west and north of Charters Towers. The hotel was first known as the Eureka, as the Sanatorium by c. 1879, as Rolfe's in c. 1882 then as the Eureka from 1884 to 1886 and finally as the Range from 1886.

William James Rolfe became the licensee in c. 1875 and he or members of his family were responsible for the name changes for the next thirty three years. After acquiring the property in 1875 William Rolfe erected another building of sawn timber while retaining the original structure. The second building was moved to a property in the Upper Ross area sometime this century and was later destroyed by a bushfire.

After the licence was surrendered sometime after 1908 the building was owned by the Moodie family who used it as refreshment rooms and a dance hall. It was later acquired by the Fryer family, early landholders in the region, and sold to the present owners in 1984.

== Description ==
The Eureka Hotel is a colonial period structure built of ironbark with a gabled roof of modern corrugated iron over the central core of three rooms. The encircling verandahs are enclosed with asbestos cement sheeting and covered with a skillion roof. The horizontal slab structure, which is raised on low, round ironbark stumps and massive half round timber bearers fixed with wooden pegs, is a rare example of bush carpentry.

It would normally have had an earthen floor, but has been raised and a timber floor added. There are no ceilings in the core: all rooms are open to the unlined iron roof, while the walls of the largest room are lined with asbestos-cement sheeting. The building stands in well tended modern gardens of trees, shrubs and plants popular in the early part of this century. Behind the structure is a modern rectangular building which is used as a kitchen/livingroom by the present owner. Behind and to the left of this structure is an old shed and post and rail stock yards.

== Heritage listing ==
The former Eureka Hotel was listed on the Queensland Heritage Register on 21 October 1992 having satisfied the following criteria.

- The place is important in demonstrating the evolution or pattern of Queensland's history.
- The place is important in demonstrating the principal characteristics of a particular class of cultural places.

It is a good example of the early shanty style of hotel and its significance is enhanced because of its association with the development of the mining and pastoral industries in Northern and Far Northern Queensland.

- The place demonstrates rare, uncommon or endangered aspects of Queensland's cultural heritage.
- The place is important in demonstrating a high degree of creative or technical achievement at a particular period.

The Eureka Hotel is representative of a transitional type of construction which led to the development of the Queensland vernacular style of architecture and, together with the Bowen River Hotel, it is a rare survivor of this early bush carpentry period of construction.
