= Bushland Beach, Queensland =

Bushland Beach
- Suburb
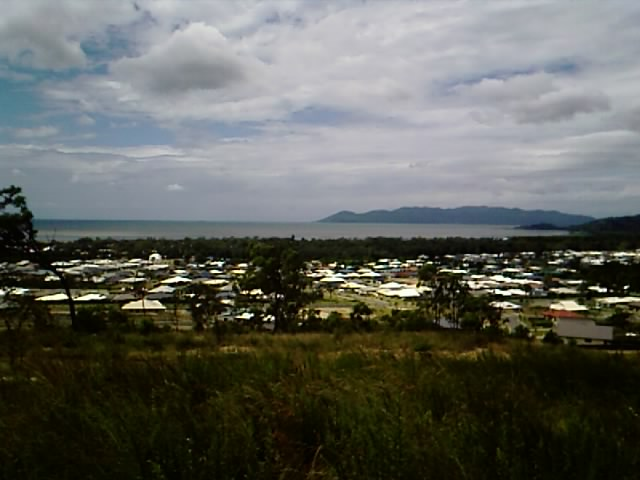

- Interactive map of Bushland Beach
- Coordinates: 19.2016°S 146.6797°E
- Country: Australia
- State: Queensland
- City: Townsville
- LGA: City of Townsville
- Location: 7.0 km (4.3 mi) N of Deeragun; 22.0 km (13.7 mi) NW of Townsville CBD; 1,354 km (841 mi) NNW of Brisbane

Government
  - State electorate: Hinchinbrook
  - Federal division: Herbert

Area
  - Total: 8.0 km^{2} (3.1 sq mi)

Population
  - Total: 6,641 (2021 census)
  - Density: 830/km^{2} (2,150/sq mi)
- Time zone: UTC+10:00 (AEST)
- Postcode: 4818
Suburbs around Bushland Beach
Beach Holm	Coral Sea	Coral Sea
Beach Holm	Bushland Beach	Town Common
Mount Low	Mount Low	Burdell

Bushland Beach is a coastal suburb in the northern beaches area of Townsville in the City of Townsville, Queensland, Australia. In the 2021 census, Bushland Beach had a population of 6,641 people.

== Geography ==
The suburb is bounded to the north by the Coral Sea with the sandy Bushland Beach (19.1884°S 146.6731°E) extending along the coastline, to the north-east by the Bohle River, to the east by Stony Creek (a tributary of the river), and to the south by Mount Low, which rises 54 metres (177 ft) above sea level (19.2081°S 146.6827°E).

== History ==
The suburb of Bushland Beach was excised from the suburb of Mount Low. The name Bushland Beach was originally used as an estate name.

== Demographics ==
In the 2016 census, Bushland Beach had a population of 6,181 people.

In the 2021 census, Bushland Beach had a population of 6,641 people.

== Education ==
There are no schools in Bushland Beach. The nearest government primary school is North Shore State School in neighbouring Burdell to the south-east. The nearest government secondary school is Northern Beaches State High School in Deeragun to the south.

== Amenities ==
There are a number of parks in the suburb, including:

- Bushland Beach Park (19.1909°S 146.6763°E)
- Ocean Park Drive Park (19.1943°S 146.6838°E)

There is a boat ramp and floating walkway on Marina Drive which gives access to Stony Creek off Bohle River (19.1995°S 146.7005°E). It is managed by the Townsville City Council.
