= Andrew Ball (Townsville pioneer) =

Irish pioneer in Queensland, Australia

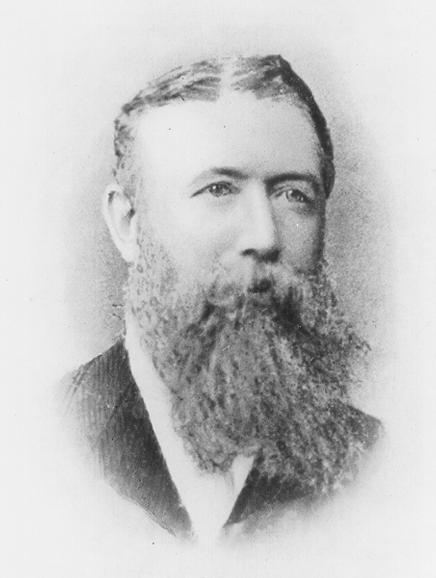
Ball in 1864.

Andrew Ball (died 1894) was a pioneer in Townsville, Queensland, Australia. He is also credited with the European discovery of its site.

== Early life ==
Andrew Ball was the son of James Creighton Ball and his wife Hannah (née Leeky).

== Townsville pioneer ==
Andrew Ball was one of the first Europeans to explore the Cleveland Bay district, and is acknowledged as the founder of Townsville. In 1864 he was managing Woodstock Station (to the south of Ross River) for pastoralists Robert Towns and John Melton Black (who together owned Jarvisfield and Woodstock cattle runs and Fanning Downs and Victoria Downs sheep stations), when Black asked Ball to explore the country to the north, to find a suitable port at Cleveland Bay from which to handle station produce. Ball, accompanied by Mark Watt Reid and two Aboriginal stockmen, set out in April 1864 and eventually found the mouth of what later was called the Ross River. The site Ball selected for a wharf and port was on Ross Creek, an arm of the Ross River Delta. Lying beneath the huge pink granite outcrop of Castle Hill, the location reminded Ball of Castletown, the capital of the Isle of Man, and that was what he called the place. When a government town site was surveyed here in 1865, the name was changed officially from Castletown to Townsville, in honour of Robert Towns.

Andrew Ball was occupied for the next few years with pastoral work before returning to Townsville in the late 1860s, and was a partner in Ball & Grimaldi, Townsville, in 1869. In 1877 he married Mrs Rose O'Neill, widow and licensee of the Exchange Hotel in Flinders Street since 1873. The Exchange had been erected in 1869 by Edward Head and was made the terminus for the Ravenswood coach service in 1870, but it was the popular Rose O'Neill who improved the hotel's reputation and nearly doubled its size in the mid-1870s. Rose O'Neill eventually purchased the hotel and following her marriage to Andrew Ball and his taking over of the licence in 1877, the Exchange became one of the most popular hotels in town. Ball was charming and widely known, with business interests both in Townsville and on the goldfields (Ravenswood and Charters Towers), and together, he and Rose developed a large and loyal cliental at the Exchange. In 1881 the two-storeyed timber hotel was destroyed by fire, but Townsville was booming and Ball immediately rebuilt in brick, the substantial new two-storeyed Exchange Hotel opening in 1882. That year Andrew Ball gave up the licence, he and Rose retiring from hotel work but retaining numerous Townsville business interests. They resided at West End for some years before moving to Rosebank in the mid-1880s.

In January 1885 Rose Ball acquired title to a 2-acre site about 3 miles out of town, southwest along the Charters Towers road, at a time when the western and southwestern suburbs of Townsville were emerging as fashionable addresses for successful Townsville businesspersons. On this property Rose and Andrew Ball erected Rosebank, a large timber residence picturesquely situated overlooking a small lagoon and creek (now filled in and part of Mindham Park). Today Rosebank is within the suburb of Mysterton.

== Later life ==
Andrew Ball died at Rosebank on 27 September 1894 aged 62, the oldest resident of Townsville. As he was highly respected, flags in Townsville were hung at half-mast. He was buried in a graveside service with Church of England rites conducted by Rev. Pike on 28 September 1894, at the largest funeral held in Townsville. At Ball's request, he was buried next to friend and fellow pioneer William Kirk in the West End Cemetery.

His widow Rose remained at Rosebank until her death in February 1925, aged 83. In January 1912 their only daughter, Annie Alice May, married lawyer (later Supreme Court Judge) Robert Johnstone Douglas, son of Queensland Premier, John Douglas.

== Legacy ==
On Sunday 1 November 1964, a monument commemorating the "100th Anniversary of Settlement in Townsville" was unveiled on The Strand, with particular mention made of four men: Robert Towns, Andrew Ball, Mark Watt Reid and John Melton Black. As at 2020, the monument is located in Anzac Memorial Park between the Centenary Fountain and the bandstand (19.2553°S 146.8230°E).
