= Alice River, Queensland =

Alice River Townsville, Queensland
- Coordinates: 19.3486°S 146.6183°E
- Population: 2,685 (2021 census)
  - Density: 67.46/km^{2} (174.73/sq mi)
- Postcode(s): 4817
- Area: 39.8 km^{2} (15.4 sq mi)
- Time zone: AEST (UTC+10:00)
- Location: 29.2 km (18 mi) WSW of Townsville CBD; 1,351 km (839 mi) NNW of Brisbane
- LGA(s): City of Townsville
- State electorate(s): Hinchinbrook
- Federal division(s): Kennedy
Suburbs around Alice River:
Black River	Rangewood	Bohle Plains
Hervey Range	Alice River	Gumlow
Granite Vale	Pinnacles	Pinnacles

Alice River is an outer south-western suburb of Townsville in the City of Townsville, Queensland, Australia. It was previously known as Rupertswood. In the 2021 census, Alice River had a population of 2,685 people.

== Geography ==
The Hervey Range Developmental Road runs along the northern boundary.

== History ==
The estate was also known as Rupertswood, because the estate was named by the developer who was Sir Rupert Clarke, 3rd Baronet of Rupertswood, after his ancestral home "Rupertswood" at Sunbury, Victoria, Australia. However, Alice River was named by one of the Bell & Reid party in 1865 for a lady of his acquaintance. The suburb along with its neighbour Rangewood, Queensland are up and coming suburbs with numerous housing developments expected in future due to the ample availability of flat develop-able land and close proximity to the Townsville Orbital road and James Cook University. Existing suburbs to the east are almost entirely built out with only some subdivision of smaller parcels and in-fill development possible.

== Demographics ==
In the 2016 census, Alice River had a population of 2,425 people.

In the 2021 census, Alice River had a population of 2,685 people.

== Education ==
There are no schools in Alice River. The nearest government primary school is The Williows State School in Kirwan to the north-east. The nearest government secondary school is Thuringowa State High School in Condon to the east.

== Amenities ==
There are a number of parks in the area:

- River Court Park (19.3266°S 146.5922°E)
- Rupertswood Park (19.3291°S 146.6039°E)

== See also ==
- Alice River (disambiguation)
