= Deeragun, Queensland =

Deeragun
- Town
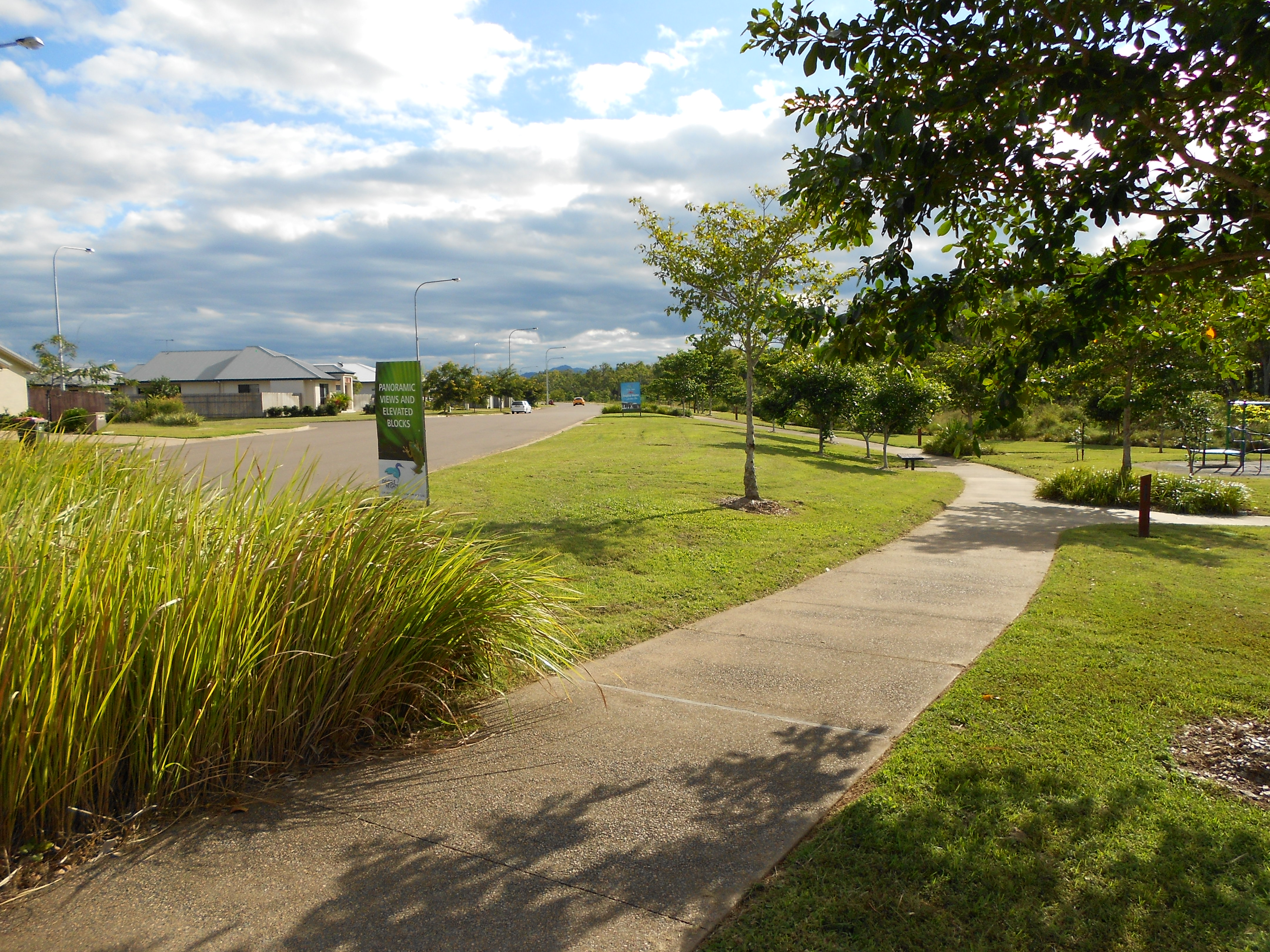
- Modern housing development in Deeragun with a walkway along Saunders Creek

- Interactive map of Deeragun
- Coordinates: 19.2491°S 146.6766°E
- Country: Australia
- State: Queensland
- City: Townsville
- LGA: City of Townsville Division 1
- Location: 16.0 km (9.9 mi) WNW of Townsville CBD; 1,374 km (854 mi) NNW of Brisbane

Government
  - State electorate: Hinchinbrook
  - Federal division: Herbert

Area
  - Total: 7.1 km^{2} (2.7 sq mi)

Population
  - Total: 4,273 (2021 census)
  - Density: 602/km^{2} (1,559/sq mi)
- Time zone: UTC+10:00 (AEST)
- Postcode: 4818
Localities around Deeragun
Beach Holm	Mount Low	Burdell
Jensen	Deeragun	Shaw
Jensen	Bohle Plains	Bohle Plains

Deeragun is a town and outer western suburb of Townsville in the City of Townsville, Queensland, Australia. In the 2021 census, the suburb of Deeragun had a population of 4,273 people.

== Geography ==
Deeragun is located approximately 16.5 kilometres (10.3 mi) west of the Townsville CBD. Deeragun is mainly a residential and rural-residential suburb characterised by the hill at Innes Estate and the Saunders Creek nature strip.

The Bruce Highway runs through from south to north-west. Deeragun is bounded to the north by the North Townsville Road (former Bruce Highway) and North Coast railway line, by Veales Road to the north-west and Saunders Creek to the south-west.

== History ==
Deeragun is a relatively new suburb, being developed in the 1990s. The suburb is laid out around the old school and Nightjar Railway Station with much of the original residential development built by the Housing Commission. The origin of the name Deeragun is unrecorded.

St Anthony's Catholic School opened in 1992.

St Anthony's Catholic College (secondary campus) opened on 24 January 2005.

Northern Beaches State High School opened on 28 January 1997.

== Demographics ==
In the 2011 census, the suburb of Deeragun had a population of 3,525 people.

In the 2016 census, the suburb of Deeragun had a population of 4,250 people.

In the 2021 census, the suburb of Deeragun had a population of 4,273 people.

== Facilities ==
The suburb contains the Woodlands Village Shopping Centre that provides Northern Beaches residents access to a supermarket, a bottle shop, a post office, several fast food outlets, medical and veterinary services, some recreational businesses and petrol station. Additional shopping and restaurant amenities have been in various stages of construction since 2011.

A police station, Community Recreation Hall, a few churches and Woodlands Skate Park are also located in Deeragun.

The Townsville City Council operates a mobile library service which visits the North Townsville Community Hub at Deeragun on Monday mornings.

== Transport ==
=== Arterial road ===
The Bruce Highway borders Deeragun to the north. It is at Deeragun where the Bruce Highway becomes a dual lane carriageway for the first time when approaching Townsville from the north. The Townsville Ring Road is a high-speed bypass road for traffic between Deeragun and Bohle Plains suburbs.

=== Public transport ===
Hermit Park Bus Service connects Deeragun with Townsville by providing through its "Route 33" a direct bus route to the Aitkenvale and Townsville CBD bus exchanges. Route 33 is part of the Department of Transport and Main Roads qconnect initiative and also has a major stop in Bushland Beach.

The taxi service as an alternative form of public transport is also available in Deeragun. This service is operated by Townsville Taxis.

=== Airport ===
Deeragun is approximately 13.5 kilometres (8.4 mi) from Townsville Airport.

== Education ==
St Anthony's Catholic College is a Catholic primary (Prep–6) and secondary (7–12) school at the corner Veales Road and Joanne Street for boys and girls at Veales Road (19.2438°S 146.6534°E). In 2017, the school had an enrolment of 1,236 students with 92 teachers (89 full-time equivalent) and 76 non-teaching staff (51 full-time equivalent).

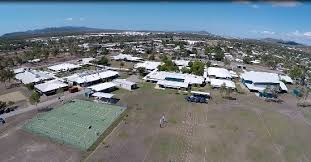
Northern Beaches State High School, 2023

Northern Beaches State High School is a government secondary (7–12) school for boys and girls at 115 Geaney Lane (off Meranti Street, 19.2479°S 146.6735°E). In 2017, the school had an enrolment of 760 students with 69 teachers (67 full-time equivalent) and 43 non-teaching staff (28 full-time equivalent). It includes a special education program.

There is no government primary school in the suburb; the nearest is Bohlevale State School just across the Bruce Highway in Burdell.

Additionally, there is a number of child care facilities available in the suburb.
