= Hervey Range =

Mountain range in Queensland, Australia

Highest point
- Peak: Mount Cataract
- Elevation: 709 m (2,326 ft)
- Coordinates: 19°17′11″S 146°30′35″E

Geography
- Country: Australia
- State: Queensland
- Region: North Queensland
- Feature: Thorntons Gap
- Range coordinates: 19°20′S 146°27′E
- Parent range: Great Dividing

The Hervey Range is a large mountain range about 39 kilometres (24 mi) west of Townsville, in Queensland, Australia. It is one of the highest peaks in the Townsville region and is also the location of the Herveys Range Heritage Tea Rooms. The highest point of the range is Mount Cataract, which is 709 metres (2,326 ft) high.

Thorntons Gap is a historic feature on the range, where a walking track that provided access to goldfields crossed the range.

Apart from the tea house, there are few houses, no estates and no shops around the Hervey Range because it is mostly rural. There are other attractions on the range, such as the former Greenvale Rail Trail, which runs up the range and into a tunnel in the mountain.

The Greenvale railway line was opened from Cobarra, north of Townsville, to the nickel mine at Greenvale in 1974, and closed in 1993 with the closure of the mine. The line passed under the Hervey Range through a series of tunnels. The tracks were removed and re-used on coal rail lines in Central Queensland.

== See also ==
- List of mountains in Australia
