= Burdell, Queensland =

Burdell
- Suburb
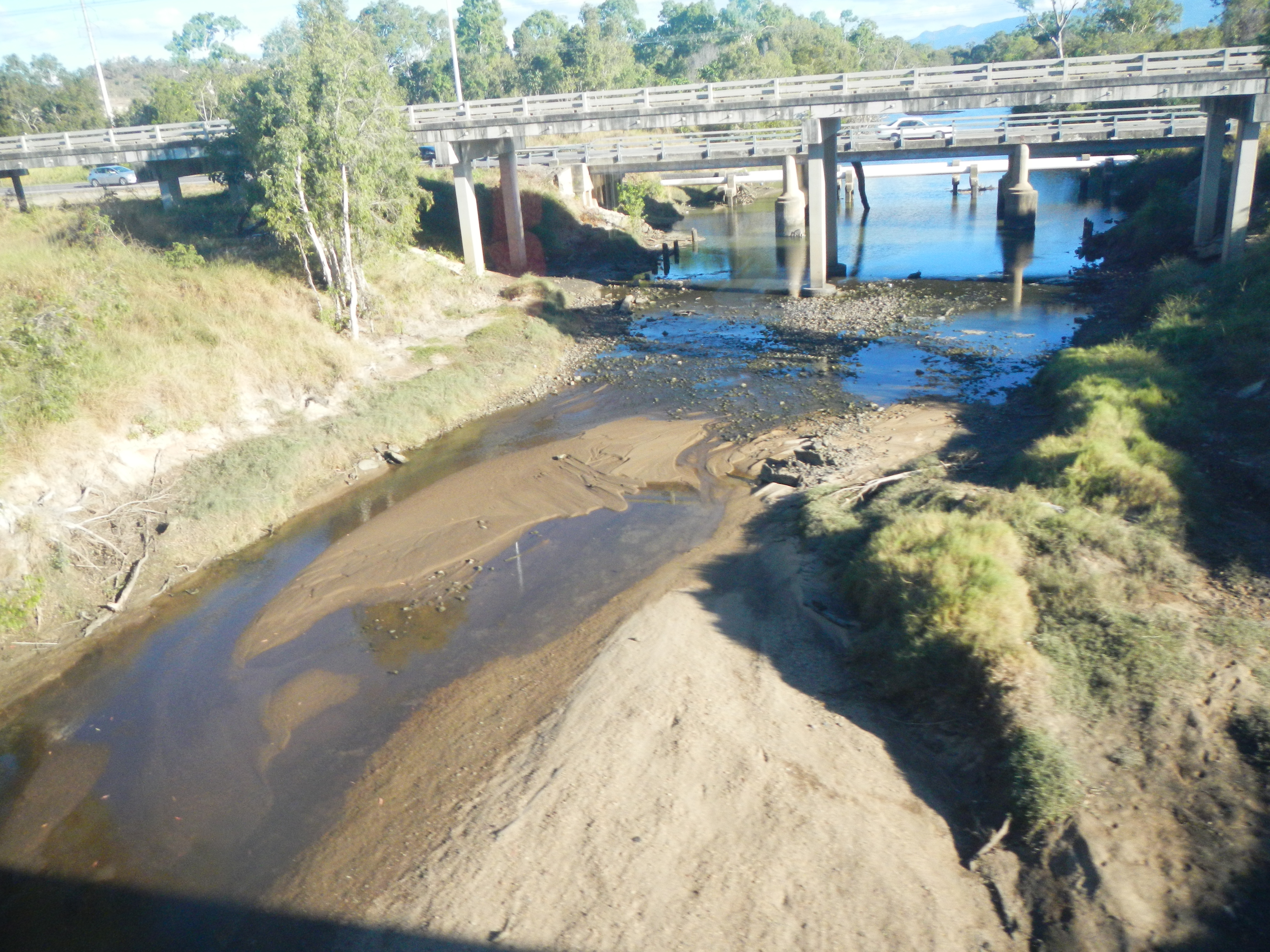
- Bruce Highway crossing the Bohle River at Burdell, 2015

- Interactive map of Burdell
- Coordinates: 19.2477°S 146.6966°E
- Country: Australia
- State: Queensland
- City: Townsville
- LGA: City of Townsville
- Location: 15.8 km (9.8 mi) W of Townsville CBD; 1,358 km (844 mi) NNW of Brisbane

Government
  - State electorate: Hinchinbrook
  - Federal division: Herbert

Area
  - Total: 15.3 km^{2} (5.9 sq mi)

Population
  - Total: 7,171 (2021 census)
  - Density: 468.7/km^{2} (1,214/sq mi)
- Time zone: UTC+10:00 (AEST)
- Postcode: 4818
Suburbs around Burdell
Bushland Beach	Bushland Beach	Town Common
Mount Low	Burdell	Bohle
Deeragun	Shaw	Cosgrove

Burdell is a north-western suburb of Townsville in the City of Townsville, Queensland, Australia. In the 2021 census, Burdell had a population of 7,171 people.

== Geography ==
The suburb is bounded to the east and north-east by the Bohle River and to north-west and north by Stony Creek which becomes a tributary of Bohle River where they met on the suburb's boundary (19.2035°S 146.7035°E).

The suburb is bounded to the south by the North Townsville Road (former Bruce Highway) and North Coast railway line with Nightjar railway station within the suburb (19.2590°S 146.6997°E).

The land use is suburban housing in the south of the suburb. There is grazing on native vegetation in the west of the locality. The northern part of the suburb is marshland. Other parts of the suburbs are currently unused.

== History ==
Bohlevale State School opened on 20 November 1911.

St Clare's Catholic Primary School opened on 24 January 2011 with an initial enrolment of 177 students.

Townsville Grammar School opened its North Shore campus in Burdell in 2015.

North Shore State School opened on 1 January 2018.

== Demographics ==
In the 2016 census, Burdell had a population of 5,814 people.

In the 2021 census, Burdell had a population of 7,171 people.

== Education ==
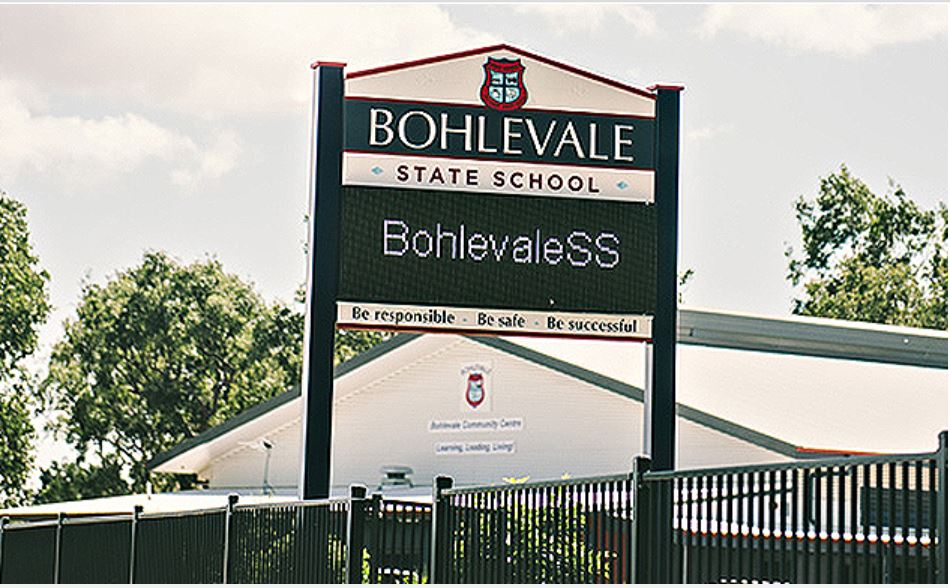
Bohelvale State School

Bohlevale State School is a government primary (Early Childhood–Year 6) school for boys and girls at Bohlevale School Road (19.2488°S 146.6855°E). It includes a special education program. In 2018, the school had an enrolment of 796 students with 61 teachers (58 full-time equivalent) and 32 non-teaching staff (21 full-time equivalent). In 2022, the school had 548 students with 44 teachers (41 full-time equivalent) and 31 non-teaching staff (20 full-time equivalent).

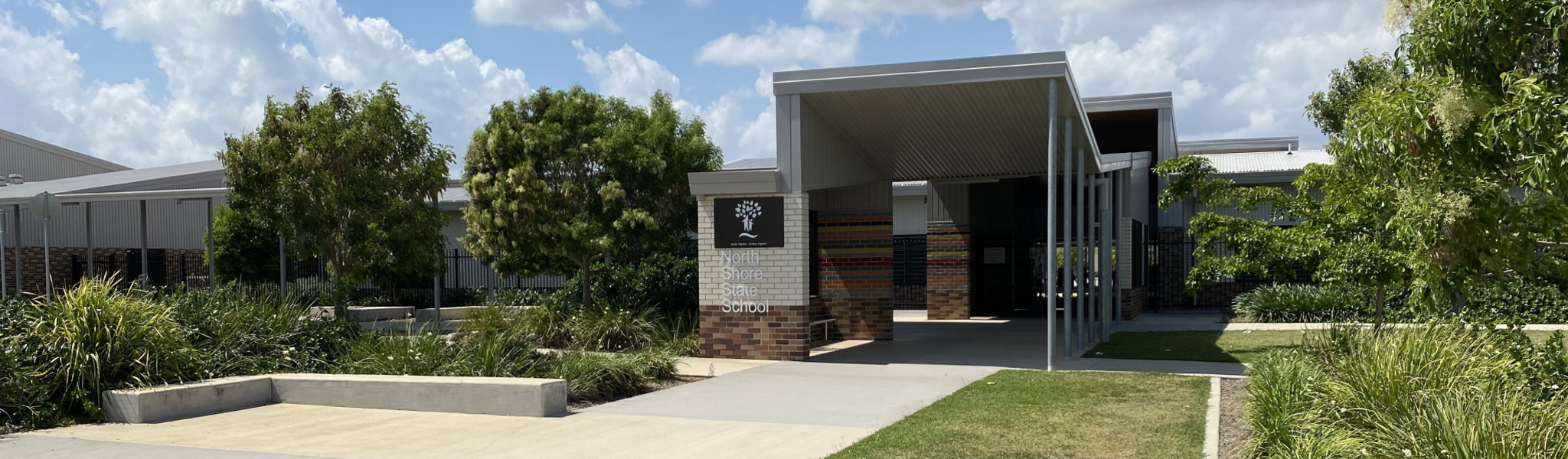
North Shore State School, 2020

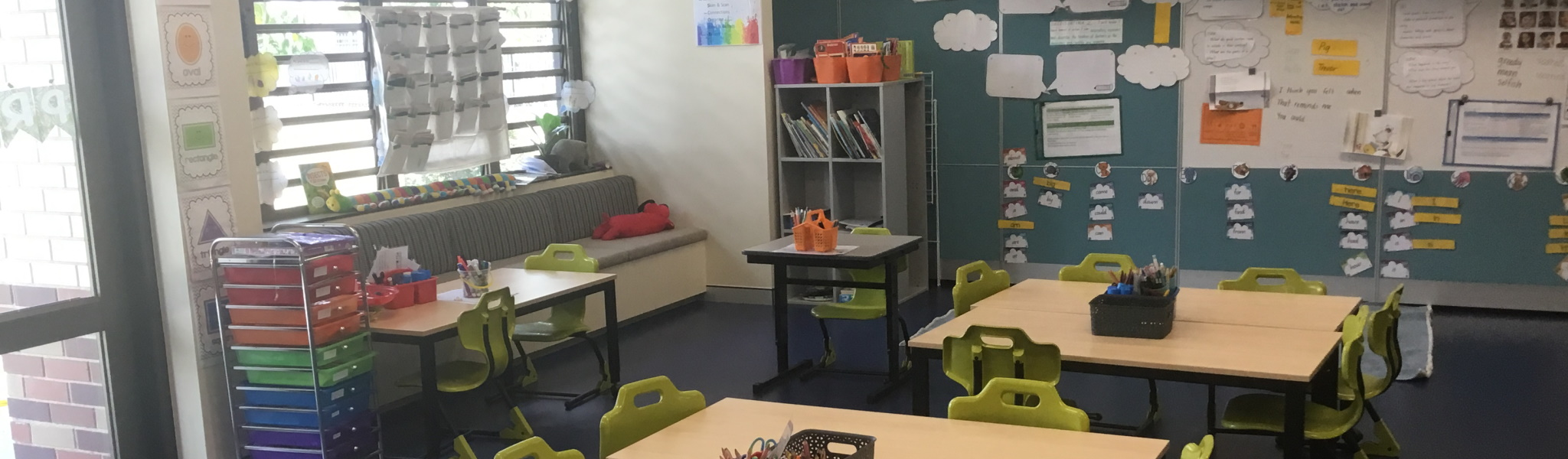
North Shore State School library, 2020

North Shore State School is a government primary (Prep–6) school for boys and girls at Langford Street (19.2332°S 146.6961°E). It includes a special education program. In 2018, the school had an enrolment of 294 students with 24 teachers and 16 non-teaching staff (13 full-time equivalent). In 2022, the school had 732 students with 50 teachers (49 full-time equivalent) and 32 non-teaching staff (23 full-time equivalent).

St Clare's Catholic School is a Catholic primary (Prep–6) school for boys and girls at Burdell Drive (19.2577°S 146.7044°E). In 2018, the school had an enrolment of 672 students with 44 teachers (38 full-time equivalent) and 37 non-teaching staff (24 full-time equivalent). In 2021, the school had 710 students with 45 teachers (40.8 full-time equivalent) and 46 non-teaching staff (31 full-time equivalent).

The North Shore Campus of Townsville Grammar School is a private primary (Pre Prep–6) school on the corner of Erskine Place and North Shore Boulevard (19.2525°S 146.7045°E).

There is no secondary school in Burdell. The nearest government secondary school is Northern Beaches State High School in neighbouring Deeragun to the south-west.

== Amenities ==
There are a number of parks in the suburb, including:

- Beau Park Drive Park (19.2467°S 146.6894°E)
- Pine Meadows Park (19.2452°S 146.6850°E)
