= John Melton Black =

Politician in Queensland, Australia

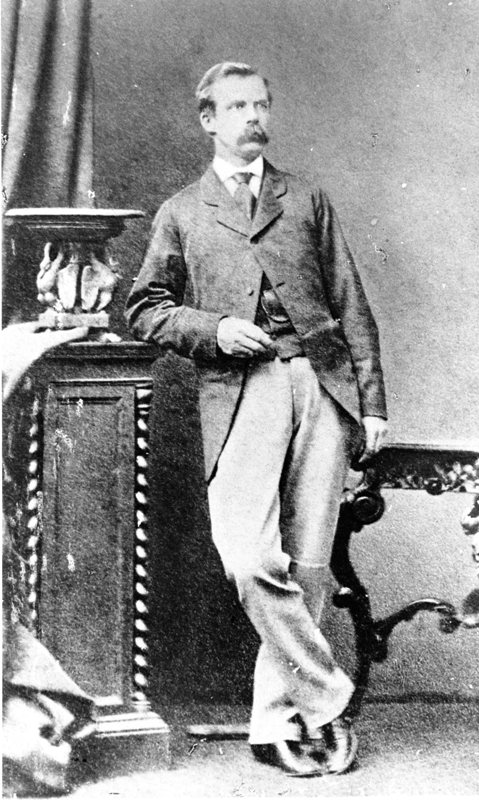
John Melton Black, first mayor of Townsville from 1866 to 1867.

John Melton Black (1830–1919) was a pioneer of Townsville, Queensland, Australia. Black ordered the expedition of Cleveland Bay to find a suitable site for a port and then established the Port of Townsville and the associated town of Townsville. He served for two terms as Mayor of Townsville.

== Early life ==
Black was born in Edinburgh, Scotland, in 1830, the son of a physician. Black became a merchant and moved to London. It was there that he heard of the Australian goldfields.

== Victoria ==
Black immigrated to Melbourne where he made his fortune, not by mining gold but by establishing a business as a carrier. In 1855 he established the first Theatre Royal in Melbourne on the north side of Bourke Street, able to hold more than 3000 people. The opening production was The School for Scandal. He also upgraded Astley's Amphitheatre, which re-opened on 16 April 1857 as Princess's Theatre and Opera House, and was its first manager. Although described as a "magnificent theatre", the £60,000 cost of the Theatre Royal's construction ultimately bankrupted Black.

== Queensland ==
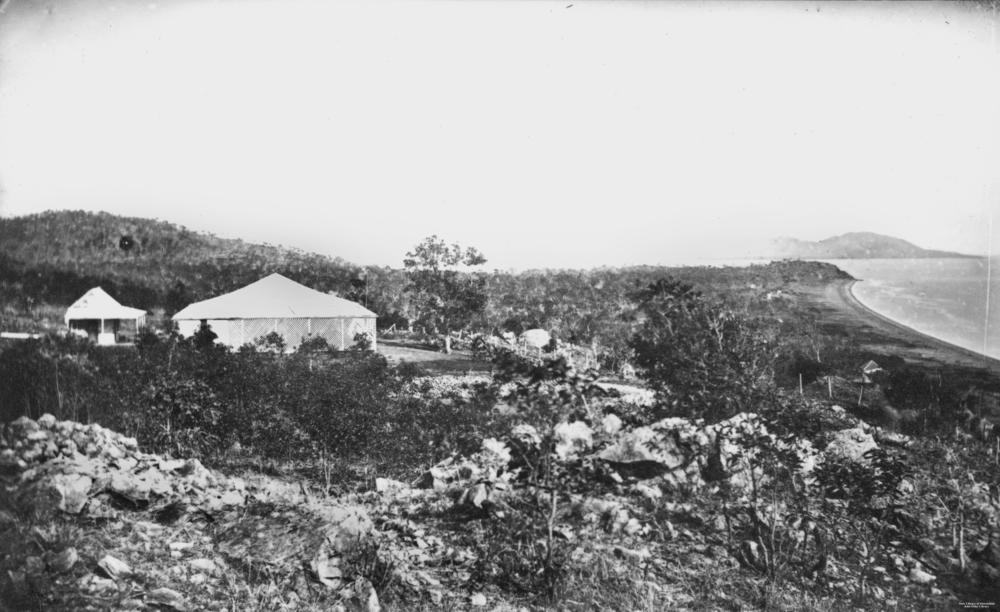
John Melton Black's residence, the first home in Townsville built around 1865

Black was attracted to the opportunities of the new colony of Queensland. With W. A. Ross, C. S. Rowe and W. Longshaw, he formed a group to go furthest north and take up pastoral land. They reached Bowen on 18 April 1861, where they founded Fanning Station. This was near the site of the Macrossan Bridge. Black was claimed to be the first man to cross the Burdekin River with flocks and herds. He liked the prospects of North Queensland and at the end of 1863, he took up a further large area of land, which became known as Woodstock Station. However, harsh conditions forced him and many others to surrender their lands to the banks as they were unable to meet their heavy mortgage commitments. Then aged 34, he became general manager for Robert Towns' pastoral interests, which included Fanning, Woodstock, Inkerman, Jarvisfield and other large holdings. Headquarters were established at Woodstock, and the long haulage of goods from Bowen was found troublesome. On the map it could be seen that the nearest coast was but twenty miles away. When Andrew Ball and Mark Watt Reid were sent to explore, they made the discovery of Ross Creek in 1864.

The new work of forming a port at Cleveland Bay and the establishment of the settlement of Townsville was undertaken by a partnership of Towns and Black. Black is credited with erecting the first wharf, surveying the first allotments and supervising the erection of its first buildings. He is said to have built the first house in Townsville. He was a stockman, merchant, surveyor, newspaper editor and pioneer of the meat industry in Townsville and surrounding districts. He served for two terms as Mayor of Townsville.

== Later life ==
Black left Townsville at the end of the year 1867, and his loss was keenly felt by the residents of North Queensland. As there had been no farewell ceremony, it was arranged to send him presents of an illuminated address and a valuable gold cup. From Sydney he proceeded to Europe, where he made an extensive tour before settling down in London. There he established a printing business.

At Hanover Square, London, he had married Marion O'Dowds, whom he first met in Townsville. Their family consisted of five sons and a daughter. Black died in 1919 aged 89 years.

== Legacy ==
On Sunday 1 November 1964, a monument commemorating the "100th Anniversary of Settlement in Townsville" was unveiled on The Strand, with particular mention made of four men: Robert Towns, Andrew Ball, Mark Watt Reid and John Melton Black. As at 2020, the monument is located in Anzac Memorial Park between the Centenary Fountain and the bandstand (19.2553°S 146.8230°E).

Black River (both the river and the suburb of Townsville) are named after him. Melton Hill (the 50-metre hill) in Townsville City was named after him and was the name of the first land sale in Townsville; Black's home was on the top of Melton Hill. The road to the Townsville Airport is called John Melton Black Drive.
