= Suburbs of Thuringowa City =

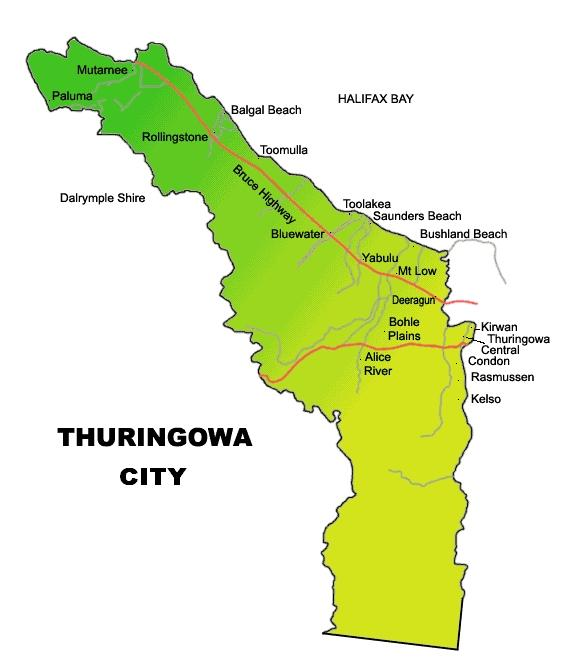
Former Thuringowa City Suburbs (2008)

This article is a list of the suburbs that used to make up the City of Thuringowa in Queensland, Australia, before the March 2008 amalgamation, which saw the City of Townsville merge with Thuringowa to form the new city of Townsville. Also listed are the former suburbs that became part of Townsville due to other boundary changes that have taken place over the years. The suburbs are listed below in order of postcode and order of years the boundaries were changed:

- 2008
  - 4815 (former urban Thuringowa):
    - Condon, Granite Vale, Gumlow, Kelso, Pinnacles, Rasmussen
  - 4816 (former rural Thuringowa):
    - Balgal Beach, Clemant, Crystal Creek, Mutarnee, Paluma, Rangewood, Rollingstone, Toomulla
  - 4817 (former urban and rural Thuringowa):
    - Alice River, Bohle Plains, Hervey Range, Kirwan, Thuringowa Central (The former Thuringowa CBD)
  - 4818 (former rural Thuringowa):
    - Beach Holm, Black River, Blue Hills, Bluewater, Bluewater Park, Bohle, Burdell, Bushland Beach, Deeragun, Jensen, Lynam, Mount Low, Saunders Beach, Shaw, Toolakea, Yabulu
- 1994 (former rural Thuringowa):
  - Calcium, Toonpan, Woodstock, Majors Creek, Reid River
- 1936 (former urban Thuringowa):
  - Oonoonba, Stuart, Idalia
- 1918 (former urban Thuringowa):
  - Hermit Park, Hyde Park, Pimlico, Mundingburra, Aitkenvale, West End, Garbutt, Belgian Gardens
- 1882 (formerly known as Ross Island):
  - South Townsville, Railway Estate
