= Barringha, Queensland =

Barringha
- Suburb
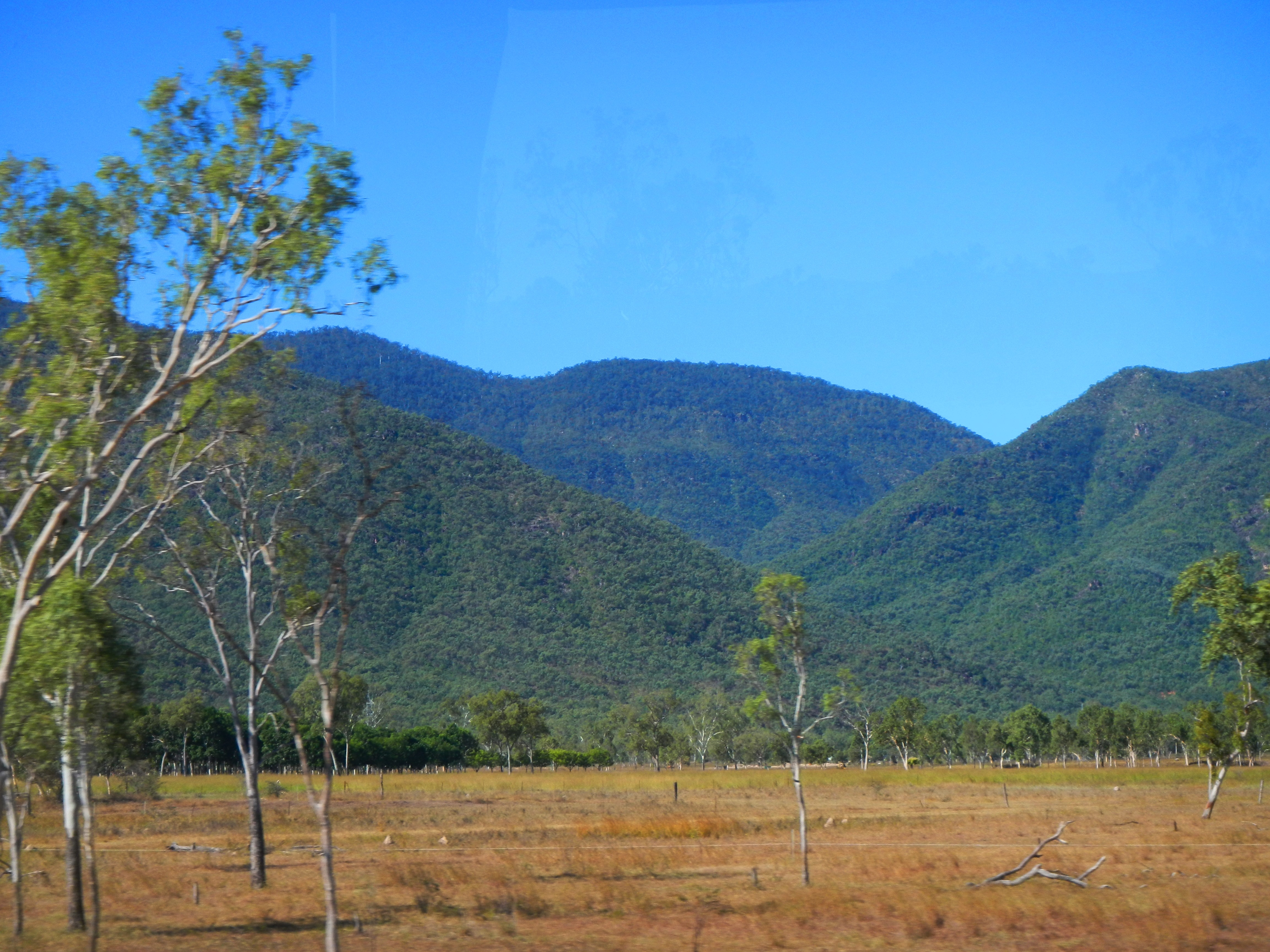
- Views from Barringha

- Interactive map of Barringha
- Coordinates: 19.5291°S 146.8147°E
- Country: Australia
- State: Queensland
- LGA: City of Townsville
- Location: 34.3 km (21.3 mi) S of Annandale; 39.7 km (24.7 mi) S of Townsville CBD; 1,349 km (838 mi) NNW of Brisbane

Government
  - State electorate: Burdekin
  - Federal division: Kennedy

Area
  - Total: 121.1 km^{2} (46.8 sq mi)

Population
  - Total: 61 (2021 census)
  - Density: 0.504/km^{2} (1.305/sq mi)
- Time zone: UTC+10:00 (AEST)
- Postcode: 4816
Suburbs around Barringha
Pinnacles	Ross River	Toonpan
Granite Vale	Barringha	Mount Elliot
Granite Vale	Woodstock	Majors Creek

Barringha is a rural locality in the City of Townsville, Queensland, Australia. In the 2021 census, Barringha had a population of 61 people.

== Geography ==
The Ross River forms the eastern boundary of the locality.

The Flinders Highway and the Mount Isa railway line run immediately parallel to form the western boundary of the locality.

The land use is almost entirely grazing on native vegetation.

== History ==
The Townsville Motocross Track opened in 1925.

Barringha railway station was on the Mount Isa railway line (19.5491°S 146.8361°E). Toopan railway station was further north on the line (19.50129°S 146.83616°E).

In the 1980s, the second stage of the Ross River Dam necessitated a deviation of the Flinders Highway and Mount Isa railway line (which otherwise ran straight north-south) further east. This was completed by 1986 and resulted in the closure of Toonpan and Barringha railway stations on the removed route; they were not re-established on new route.

The locality was officially named and bounded on 27 July 1991.

== Demographics ==
In the 2016 census, Barringha had a population of 62 people.

In the 2021 census, Barringha had a population of 61 people.

== Education ==
There are no schools in Barringha. The nearest government primary school is Woodstock State School in neighbouring Woodstock to the south. The nearest government secondary school is William Ross State High School in Annandale in Townsville.

== Attractions ==
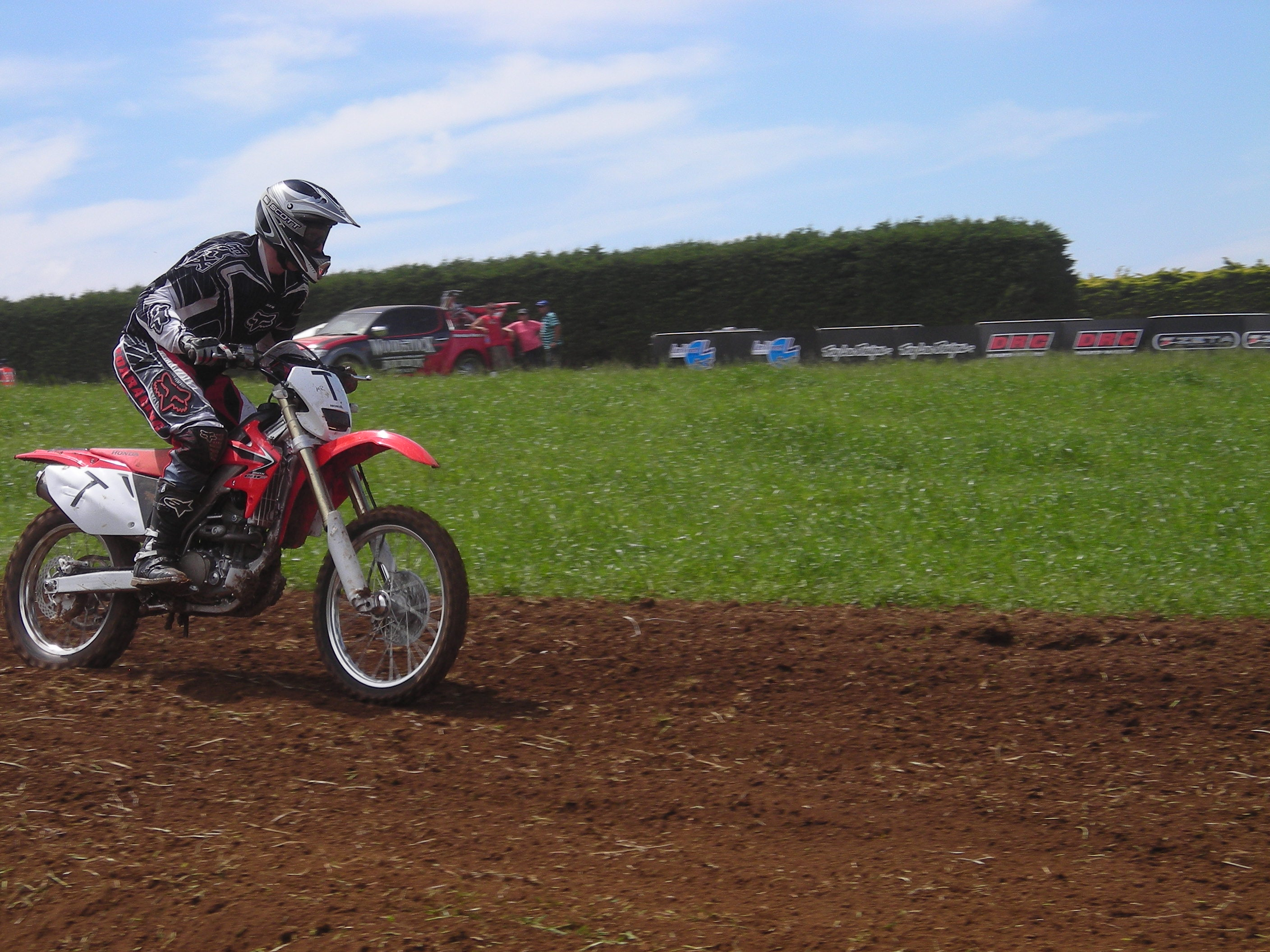
Townsville Motocross Track, Barringha, 2008

The Townsville Motocross Track is at 8 Buck Road (19.5710°S 146.8381°E). It is operated by the Townsville Motorcycle Club. It is also known as the Woodstock Motocross and Dirt Track (but, with current locality boundaries, it is not in Woodstock).

The Sporting Shooters have a range at 1057 Mountview Road (19.5599°S 146.8999°E).
