= Ross River, Queensland =

Ross River
- Suburb
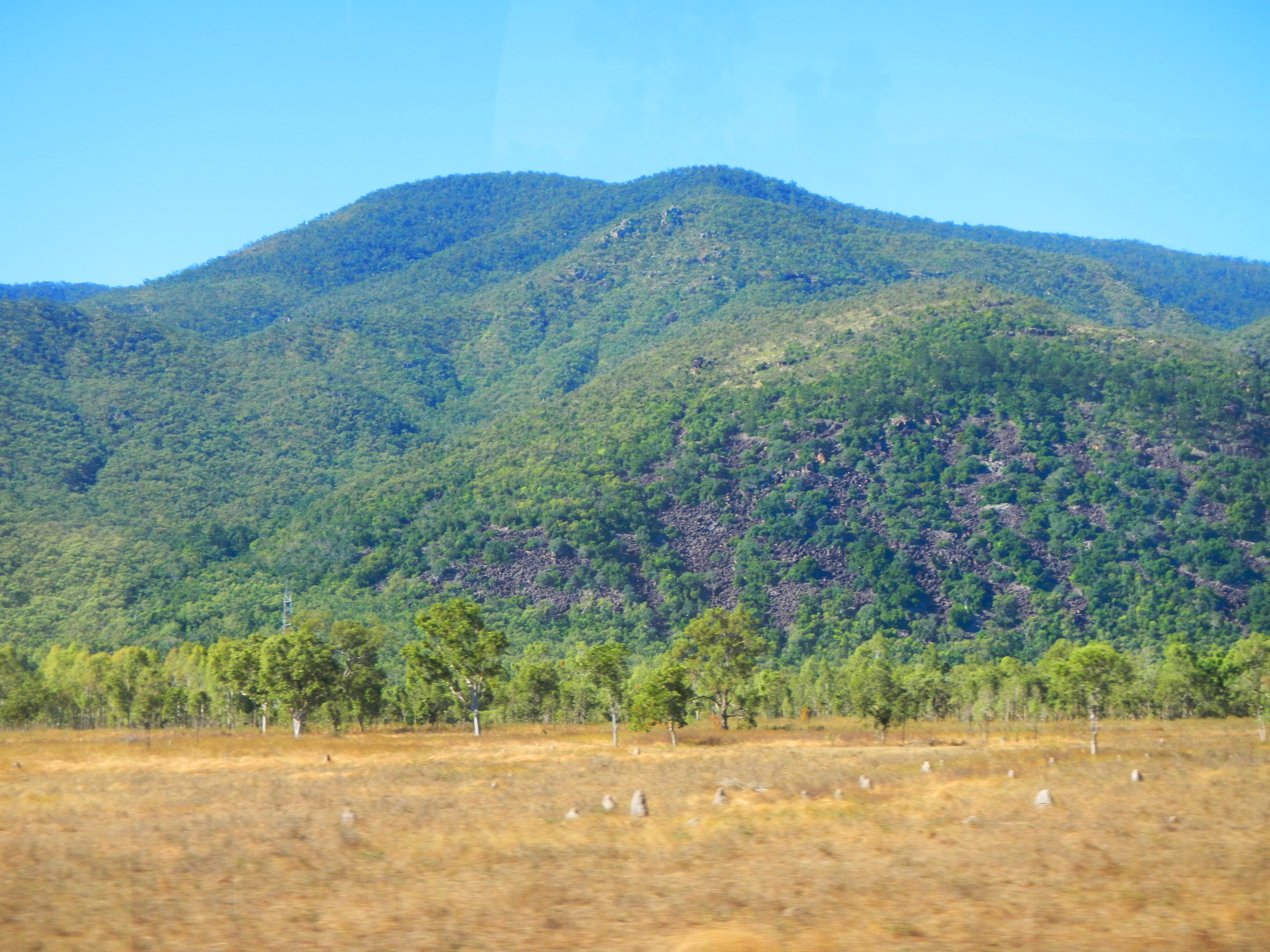
- Rural scene in Ross River, 2013

- Interactive map of Ross River
- Coordinates: 19.4800°S 146.7930°E
- Country: Australia
- State: Queensland
- LGA: City of Townsville
- Location: 39.4 km (24.5 mi) S of Annandale; 45.6 km (28.3 mi) S of Townsville CBD; 1,349 km (838 mi) NNW of Brisbane

Government
  - State electorate: Burdekin
  - Federal division: Kennedy

Area
  - Total: 121.3 km^{2} (46.8 sq mi)

Population
  - Total: 0 (2021 census)
  - Density: 0.000/km^{2} (0.000/sq mi)
- Time zone: UTC+10:00 (AEST)
- Postcode: 4816
Suburbs around Ross River
Kelso	Mount Stuart	Oak Valley
Pinnacles	Ross River	Brookhill
Barringha	Barringha	Toonpan

Ross River is a rural locality in the City of Townsville, Queensland, Australia. In the 2021 census, Ross River had "no people or a very low population".

== Geography ==
The Ross River (the river) forms the western boundary of the locality. Lake Ross occupies much of the locality and is a reservoir created by the Ross River Dam across the river.

== History ==
The locality is presumably named after the river Ross River which is named after publican William Alfred Ross.

== Demographics ==
In the 2016 census, Ross River had "no people or a very low population".

In the 2021 census, Ross River had "no people or a very low population".

== Education ==
There are no schools in the locality. The nearest government primary schools are Wulguru State School in Wulguru to the north, Woodstock State School in Woodstock to the south, and Kelso State School in neighbouring Kelso to the north-west. The nearest government secondary school is William Ross State High School in Annandale to the north. There are also a number of non-government schools in nearby suburbs of Townsville.
