= Toonpan, Queensland =

Toonpan
- Suburb
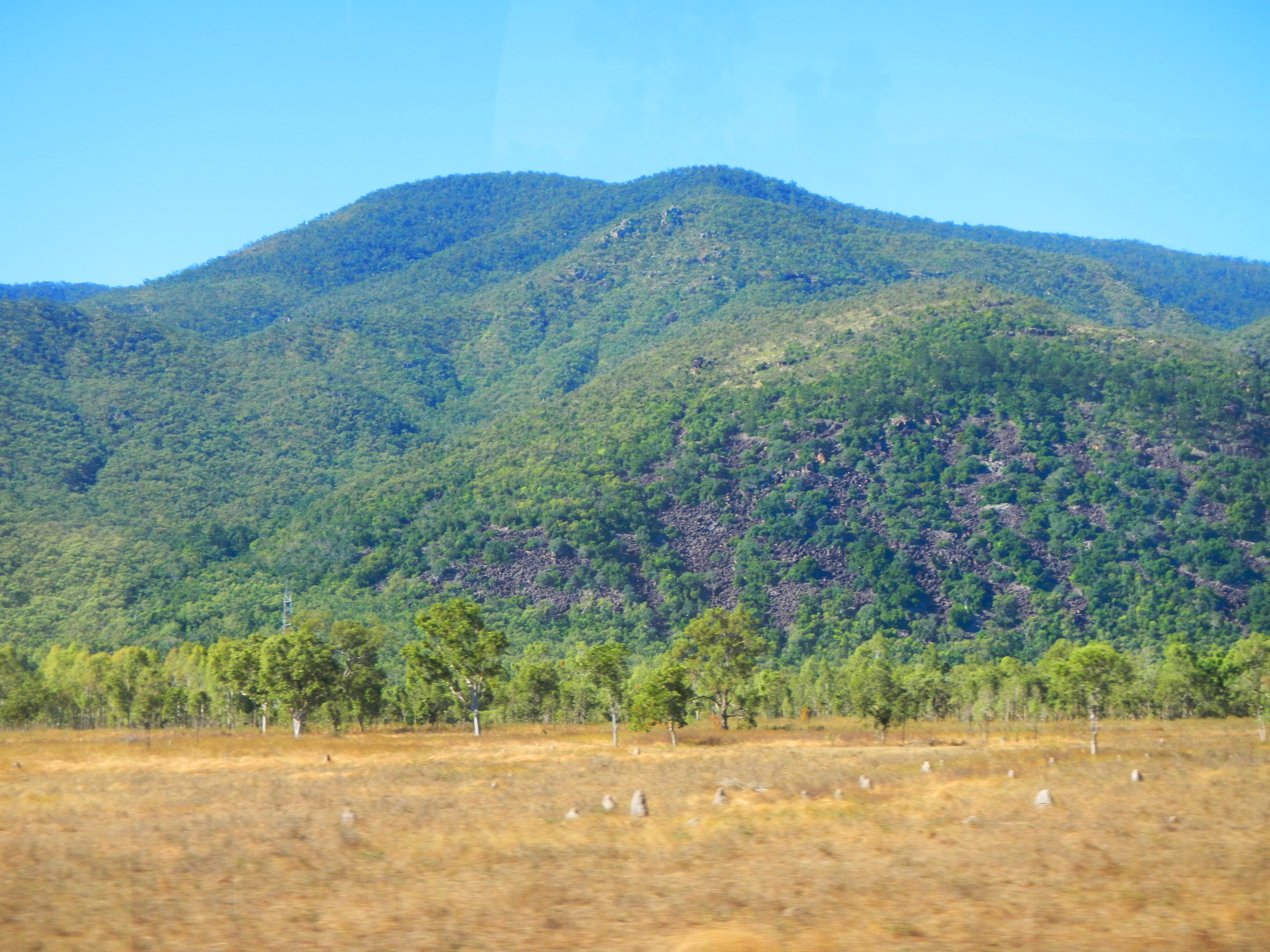
- Looking from the Flinders Highway across Toonpan towards Mount Elliot, 2013

- Interactive map of Toonpan
- Coordinates: 19.5038°S 146.8719°E
- Country: Australia
- State: Queensland
- LGA: City of Townsville
- Location: 12.3 km (7.6 mi) N of Woodstock; 25.5 km (15.8 mi) SSE of Annandale; 30.6 km (19.0 mi) S of Townsville CBD; 1,344 km (835 mi) NNW of Brisbane

Government
  - State electorate: Burdekin
  - Federal division: Kennedy

Area
  - Total: 12.7 km^{2} (4.9 sq mi)

Population
  - Total: 62 (2021 census)
  - Density: 4.88/km^{2} (12.64/sq mi)
- Time zone: UTC+10:00 (AEST)
- Postcode: 4816
Suburbs around Toonpan
Ross River	Brookhill	Mount Elliot
Ross River	Toonpan	Mount Elliot
Ross River	Barringha	Mount Elliot

Toonpan is a rural locality in the City of Townsville, Queensland, Australia. In the 2021 census, Toonpan had a population of 62 people.

== Geography ==
The locality is bounded to the west by the Mount Isa railway line and the Flinders Highway.

The terrain varies from 50 to 190 metres (160 to 620 ft) above sea level with the higher elevations in the east of the locality, the foothills of Mount Elliot.

The land use is predominantly grazing on native vegetation with a small amount of crop growing.

== History ==
The first section of the Great Northern railway line opened on 20 December 1880 and followed a southerly path from Townsville to Reid River via Stuart, Antill Plains, Toonpan, Woodstock and Calcium. Toonpan railway station was at 19.50129°S 146.83617°E (now within the present-day boundaries of the suburb of Ross River).

Toonpan Provisional School opened circa 1895, becoming Toonpan State School on 1 January 1909. Between 1920 and 1923, it operated as a half-time school with Manton Provisional School (meaning the two schools shared a single teacher). It resumed as a full-time state school in 1923. It closed circa 1940. It was located immediately south-west of the railway station.

During World War II, the 29th Brigade of the Australian Army was based in Toonpan from May to September 1942. After September it moved to the Black River area, north of Townsville, before going to Papua New Guinea in January 1943.

In the 1980s, the second stage of the Ross River Dam necessitated a deviation of the Flinders Highway and Mount Isa railway line (which otherwise ran straight north–south) further east. This was completed by 1986 and resulted in the closure of Toonpan and Barringha railway stations on the removed route; they were not re-established on new route.

The locality was officially named and bounded on 27 July 1991.

== Demographics ==
In the 2016 census, Toonpan had a population of 57 people.

In the 2021 census, Toonpan had a population of 62 people.

== Education ==
There are no schools in Toonpan. The nearest government primary school is Woodstock State School in Woodstock to the south. The nearest government secondary school is William Ross State High School in Annandale, Townsville, to the north.
