= DriveIt NQ =

Race track in Queensland, Australia

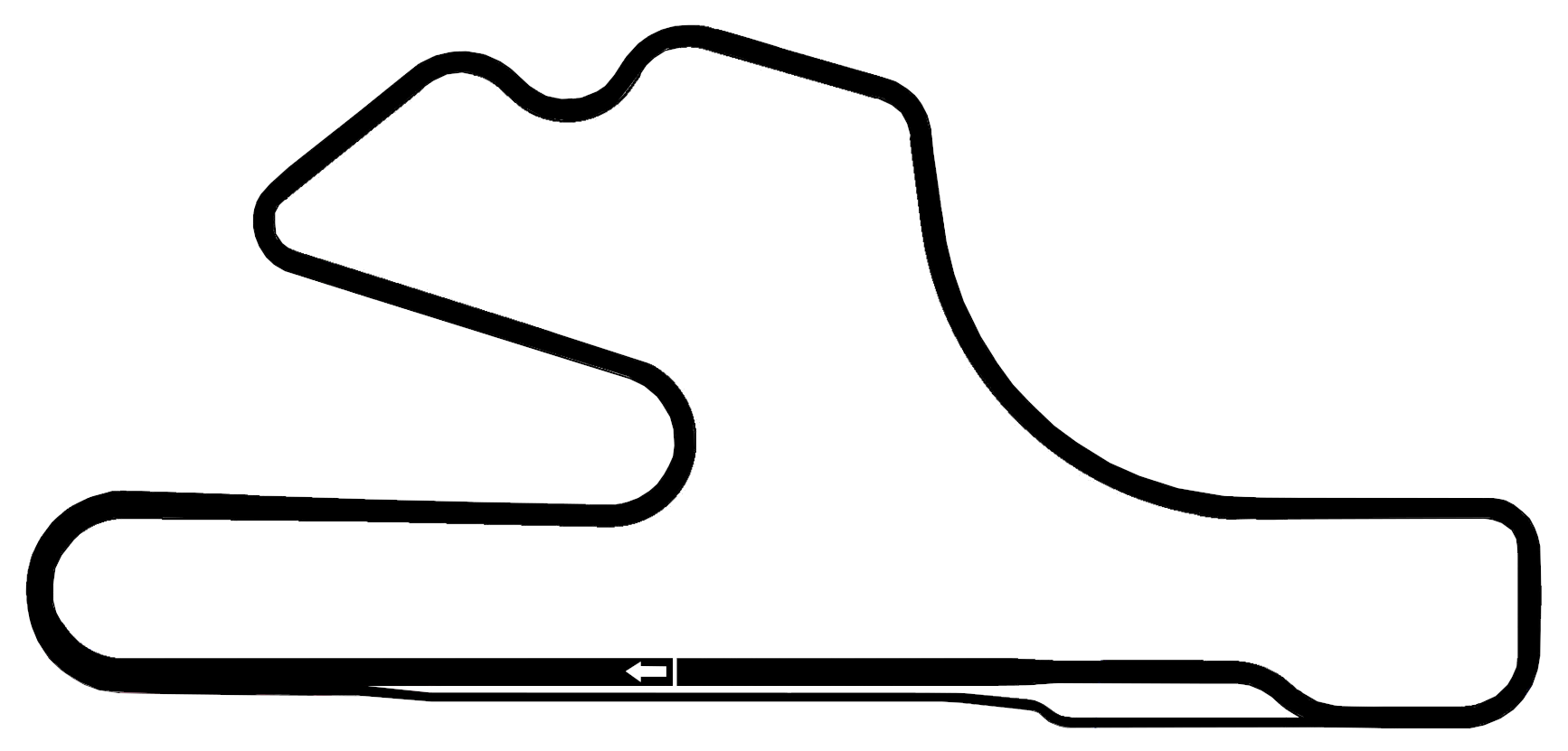
- Original Circuit (2023–present)
- Location: Quarry Road, Calcium, Queensland
- Coordinates: 19°37′26.15″S 146°49′11.88″E
- Broke ground: 2021
- Opened: May 2023; 2 years ago
- Major events: Motor Events Racing

Original Circuit (2023–present)
- Length: 2.750 km (1.709 mi)
- Turns: 12
- Race lap record: 1.27.363 (Detuned Motorsport, Nissan, 2023, Motor Events Racing)

DriveIt NQ is a 2.750 km (1.709 mi) permanent race track and driver training facility in Townsville, Queensland, Australia. The circuit is opened in May 2023.

== History ==
Plans for a dedicated motoring and motorsport facility in North Queensland emerged in February 2016, partially driven by the success of the Townsville 500, when driver training operator Pat Driscoll signed a long-term lease with Townsville City Council over a plot of land in Calcium to the city's west. Plans for the facility publicly emerged in September 2018 before construction on the facility began in August 2020 following input from Jack Miller, Paul Morris and Molly Taylor. Having secured AU$22 million in State and Federal funding, asphalt laying on the base circuit concluded in February 2023.
