= Mingela, Queensland =

Mingela
- Town
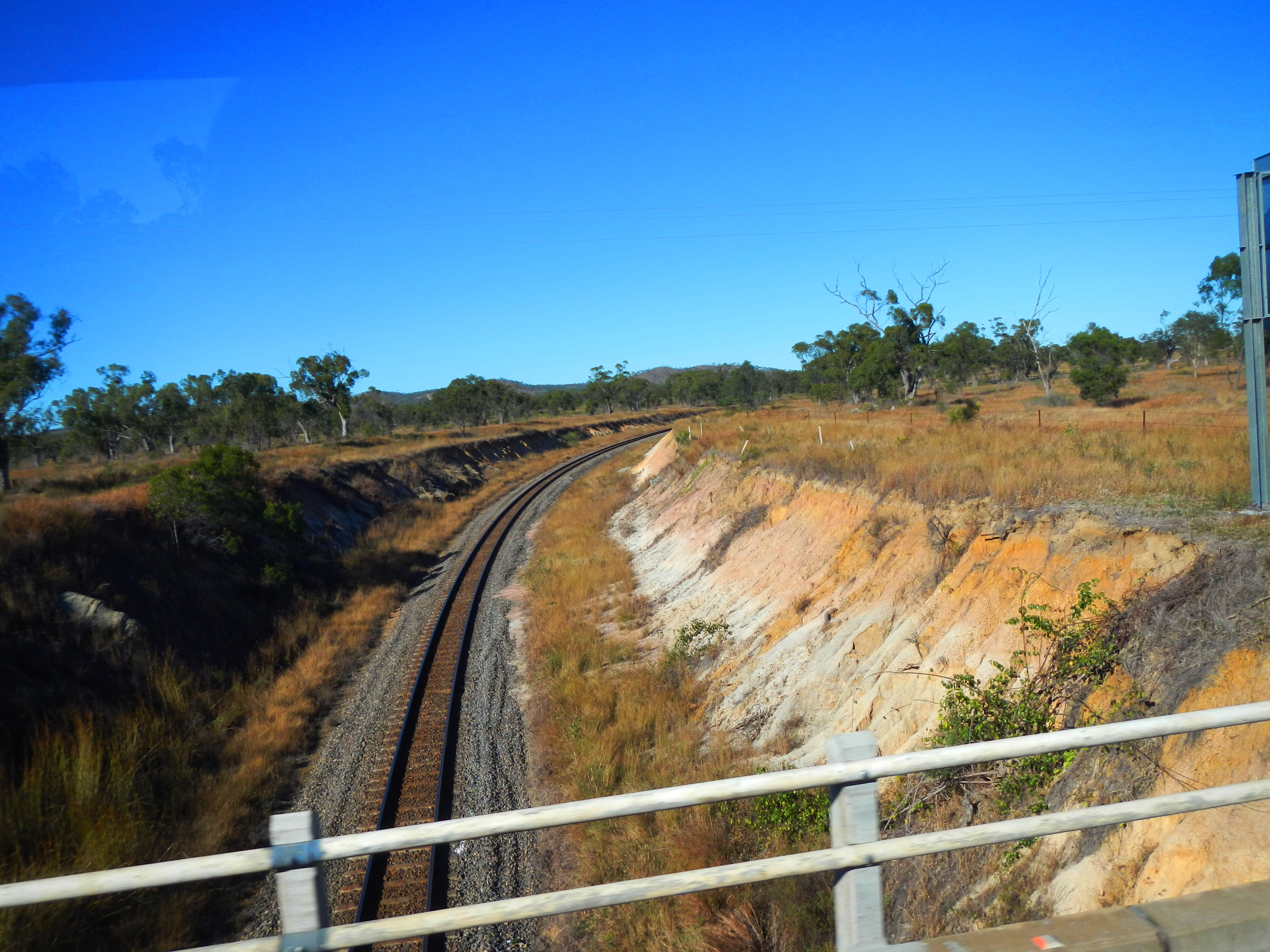
- Flinders Highway crossing the Great Northern (Mount Isa) railway line, 2013

- Interactive map of Mingela
- Coordinates: 19.8797°S 146.6338°E
- Country: Australia
- State: Queensland
- LGA: Charters Towers Region
- Location: 47.4 km (29.5 mi) NE of Charters Towers; 90.7 km (56.4 mi) SSW of Townsville; 1,356 km (843 mi) NNW of Brisbane

Government
  - State electorate: Traeger
  - Federal division: Kennedy

Area
  - Total: 476.2 km^{2} (183.9 sq mi)

Population
  - Total: 14 (2021 census)
  - Density: 0.0294/km^{2} (0.0761/sq mi)
- Time zone: UTC+10:00 (AEST)
Localities around Mingela
Dotswood	Reid River	Reid River
Dotswood	Mingela	Ravenswood
Ravenswood	Ravenswood	Ravenswood

Mingela is a rural town and locality in the Charters Towers Region, Queensland, Australia. In the 2021 census, the locality of Mingela had a population of 14 people.

== Geography ==
Mingela railway station is on the Great Northern railway from Townsville to Mount Isa (19.8783°S 146.6330°E). Prior to 16 March 1931, it was known as Ravenswood Junction railway station. Haughton Valley railway station is an abandoned railway station on the same line (19.8499°S 146.6736°E).

Mingela has the following mountains (from north to south):

- Mount Prince Charlie (19.7983°S 146.8057°E) 393 metres (1,289 ft)
- Mount Square Post (19.8138°S 146.7297°E) 365 metres (1,198 ft)
- The Bluff (19.8775°S 146.7298°E) 546 metres (1,791 ft)
- Sulphide Mountain (19.8903°S 146.6867°E) 321 metres (1,053 ft)
- Cowhead Mountain (19.8957°S 146.6643°E) 335 metres (1,099 ft)

== History ==
The area was originally called Cunningham and then Ravenswood Junction. However, when the Ravenswood branch railway closed on 16 March 1931, the railway station was then renamed Mingela (an Aboriginal word meaning a string of waterholes).

Ravenswood Junction Provisional School opened on 3 January 1882. Circa 1910 it became Ravenswood Junction State School. In 1931 it was renamed Mingela State School. It closed on 31 December 2002. The school was at 33 Burdekin Street (19.8812°S 146.6336°E). The school's website was archived.

The locality of Mingela was created on 8 July 2016 by combining the former locality of Crimea with parts of Ravenswood, Reid River and Dotswood.

== Demographics ==
In the 2021 census, the locality of Mingela had a population of 14 people.

== Education ==
There are no schools in Mingela. The nearest government primary schools are Woodstock State School in Woodstock to the north and Ravenswood State School in neighbouring Ravenswood to the south-east. The nearest government secondary school is Charters Towers State High School in Charters Towers City to the south-west..

== Amenities ==
The Mingela branch of the Queensland Country Women's Association meets at the CWA Hall on the corner of Ravenswood Street and Towers Street (19.8798°S 146.6348°E).
