= Pinnacles, Queensland =

Pinnacles
- Suburb
- Interactive map of Pinnacles
- Coordinates: 19.4447°S 146.6794°E
- Country: Australia
- State: Queensland
- LGA: City of Townsville
- Location: 15.3 km (9.5 mi) S of Condon; 28.1 km (17.5 mi) SW of Townsville CBD; 1,368 km (850 mi) NNW of Brisbane

Government
  - State electorates: Thuringowa; Burdekin
  - Federal division: Kennedy

Area
  - Total: 153.2 km^{2} (59.2 sq mi)

Population
  - Total: 83 (2021 census)
  - Density: 0.542/km^{2} (1.403/sq mi)
- Time zone: UTC+10:00 (AEST)
- Postcode: 4815
Suburbs around Pinnacles
Alice River	Gumlow	Kelso
Granite Vale	Pinnacles	Ross River
Granite Vale	Granite Vale	Barringha

Pinnacles is a rural locality in the City of Townsville, Queensland, Australia. In the 2021 census, Pinnacles had a population of 83 people. It is a future urban growth area with many estates already planned.

== Geography ==
Most of the terrain in the locality is mountainous rising to peaks such Frederick's Peak (679 metres) and South Pinnacle (729 metres, just west of the locality in neighbouring Granite Vale); this is undeveloped bushland. The lower flatter terrain around the northern and eastern boundaries is used for farming. The eastern boundary is the Ross River and Lake Ross (created by the Ross River Dam just to the north-east of the locality in Kelso).

== Demographics ==
In the 2016 census, Pinnacles had a population of 93 people.

In the 2021 census, Pinnacles had a population of 83 people.

== Education ==
There are no schools in Pinnacles. The nearest government primary schools are:

- The Willows State School in Kirwan to the north
- Rasmussen State School in Rasmussen to the north-east
- Kelso State School in neighbouring Kelso to the north-east

The nearest government secondary school is Thuringowa State High School in Condon to the north-east.

== Facilities ==
Ross River Solar Farm is on a 202-hectare (500-acre) site, formerlya mango farm. It can generate 116 megawatts (156,000 hp) of electricity, sufficient to supply 54,000 homes. It is at 99 Kelson Drive (19.41377°S 146.72096°E).
