= 2019 Townsville flood =

2019 flood in Queensland, Australia

2019 Townsville and northwest Queensland floods
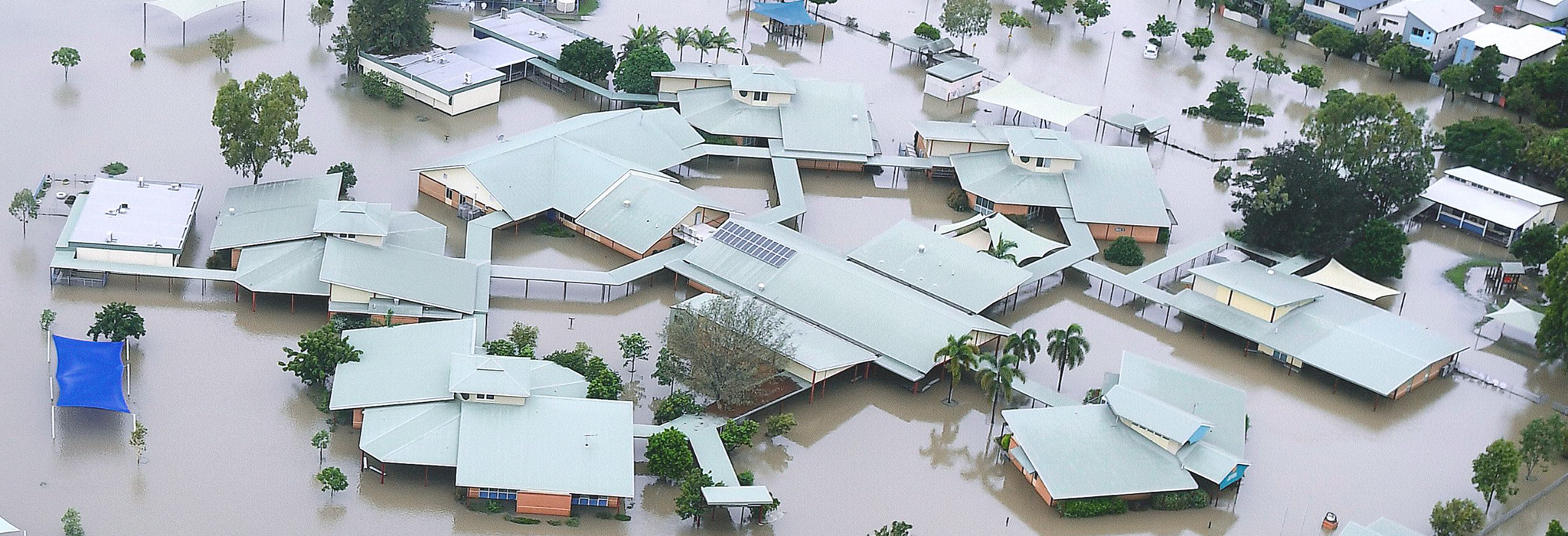
- Oonoonba State School during the 2019 Townsville flood
- Date: 23 January 2019 - 7 February 2019
- Location: Northwest Queensland, Australia
- Cause: Tropical Low 13U; Monsoon trough
- Deaths: 5 (3 direct, 2 indirect)
- Property damage: A$1.243 billion

The 2019 Townsville flood was a major flood event that occurred in the city of Townsville and surrounding areas, on the eastern coast of Queensland, Australia. Townsville has endured around 20 major flooding events since colonial settlement in the 1860s, but the 2019 event was one of the worst natural disasters to ever impact the region.

== Overview ==
The 2019 Townsville flood was caused by a slow-moving tropical low, situated east of Mt Isa, embedded in a stalled, but vigorously active, monsoon trough. Northerly, moisture-rich monsoonal air driven by the tropical low was encountered by coastal south-easterly winds, creating a convergence zone of unstable weather. The net result of the two opposing air masses was then driven westwards over the mainland. The system persisted for approximately one week with little deviation or movement, producing consistent medium to heavy rainfall over the affected areas, with isolated very heavy showers and locally damaging winds. Major to historic flooding occurred across the Townsville region as a result.

Two fatalities were reported after bodies were found in floodwaters and a third person reported missing was never found. Two additional deaths were reported on February 12 and February 26 due to melioidosis, with at least ten more people hospitalised with the bacterial infection. The weather system went on to produce major flooding in northern Central Queensland, most of which was severely drought-stricken. In addition to damaged infrastructure such as train lines, as many as 500,000 cattle were estimated to have perished in the ensuing floodwaters.

Some Townsville suburbs, particularly Rosslea, Hermit Park, and Idalia, experienced major inundation, with pockets of intense rainfall causing dangerous flash flooding in the northern suburb of Bluewater. Record heights at the Ross River Dam forced emergency planners to fully open the dam's spillway, releasing additional water into the Ross River, further compounding the existing flooding downstream. Severe erosion was observed on the banks of the Ross River, causing structural damage to pathways and boardwalks. The rushing of water caused supporting rocks and concrete under one particular section of pathway to be eroded away, creating a dangerous hazard for pedestrians. Record spillway heights at Aplins Weir caused damage to a pedestrian bridge.

Multiple agencies assisted with rescue and recovery, including the State Emergency Service (SES), Queensland Government, Townsville City Council, Queensland Rural Fire Service, Australian Defence Force and Team Rubicon Australia (now known as Disaster Relief Australia). Notably, many locals volunteered to assist emergency services, evacuating trapped residents by boat from their flooded homes. The large number of volunteers, boats, and resulting queue of helpers were later dubbed the "tinny army" by local media.

The floods were one of Queensland's worst natural disasters, and had heavily impacted the region. Townsville has a long history of battles against the extremes of heavy flooding and long droughts.

Approximately 3300 homes were damaged by floodwaters, and about 1500 homes rendered uninhabitable. As many as 30,000 insurance claims were filed in the aftermath of the event, with damages estimated to be A$1.243 billion based on insurance losses.

== Meteorological synopsis ==
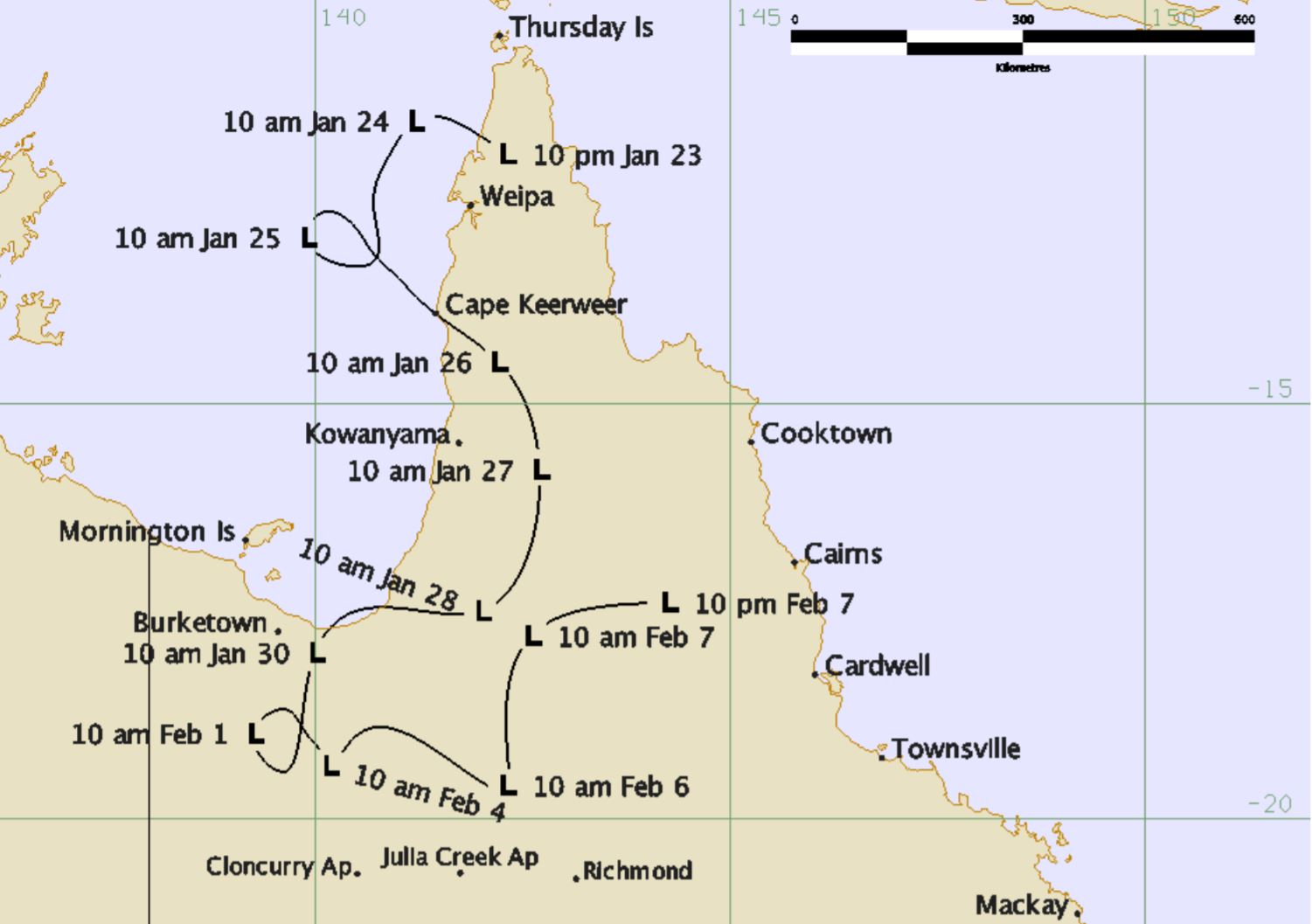
Track of Tropical Low 13U

In the later half of January 2019, a pulse of the Madden–Julian oscillation moved through the Australian region, where it strengthened a weak monsoon trough located north of the continent. At this stage, the monsoon trough contained two tropical lows, one of which was located within the Torres Strait, while the other low was located within the Timor Sea. Over the next few days, the monsoon trough intensified, as it moved southwards and several areas of low pressure were identified along this trough, around the Cape York Peninsula.
