= Ross Creek (North Queensland) =

Ross
- Location of Ross Creek mouth in Queensland
- Etymology: W. A. Ross, a colonial settler

Location
- Country: Australia
- State: Queensland
- Region: North Queensland

Physical characteristics
- Source: Grasshopper Range
  - location: below Camp Engstrom
  - coordinates: 19°16′53″S 146°48′37″E
  - elevation: 496 m (1,627 ft)
- Mouth: confluence with the Ross River
  - location: west of the Ross River Dam
  - coordinates: 19°28′31″S 146°43′13″E
  - elevation: 42 m (138 ft)
- Length: 21 km (13 mi)

Basin features
- River system: Ross River catchment

The Ross Creek, part of the Ross River catchment, is a minor creek in the upper reaches of the river catchment, located southwest of Townsville, in North Queensland, Australia.

== Course and features ==
The creek rises on the eastern slopes of the Grasshopper Range below Camp Engstrom and southwest of the settlement of Alice River. The creek flows generally southeast before reaching its confluence with the Ross River on the western banks of the Ross River Dam. The creek descends 454 metres (1,490 ft) over its 21-kilometre (13 mi) course.

== See also ==
- List of rivers of Australia § Queensland
