= Pinnacles National Park (Queensland) =

Pinnacles National Park is a protected area in the localities of Hervey Range and Granite Vale in the City of Townsville, Queensland, Australia.

== Geography ==
Pinnacles National Park is a 1,337-hectare (3,300-acre) site (19.424°S 146.572°E) on the ridge and eastern slopes of the Hervey Range.

== History ==
The park was gazetted in March 2011 as the start of an effort to protect the rugged bushland character of Townsville's scenic rim. It is named for the exposed granite batholiths.

== Fauna and flora ==
The park protects an endangered plant Sannantha papillosa and an endangered bird, Poephila cincta (black-throated finch).
