= Reid River Airfield =

- Queensland, Australia

Site information
- Type: Military airfield

Location
- Coordinates: 19°45′45″S 146°50′40″E

Site history
- In use: 1942-1945

Reid River Airfield is a World War II airfield located to the south of the Reid River in the locality of Reid River, Charters Towers Region, inland from Townsville, Queensland, Australia.

Disused since the war as an airfield, the former base is private property used for mustering cattle and horses. An arch marks the western edge of the strip, easily accessible from the main road. With permission of the owner, visitors can tour the strip. On the eastern edge of the strip are concrete pads from former buildings including the mess hall and first air station. Also, there are the remains of a B-26 crash site and a former 2nd BS camp area. Small markers, left by veterans in 1992 mark these locations.

== History ==
The airfield, which had a single main runway running east to west, was built by the United States Army Air Forces.

Two units were based at the airfield:

- 2nd Bombardment Squadron, 22nd Bombardment Group, 9 April-9 October 1942
- 408th Bombardment Squadron, 22nd Bombardment Group (later re-designated the 18th Reconnaissance Squadron), 12 April-15 October 1942

Both squadrons initially flew Martin B-26 Marauder medium bombers. The first mission by the 408th BS was on 22 April 1942 from Reid River, operating until January 1943 when the group went on R&R. In early February 1943, both the 2nd and 408th Squadrons converted from B-26 to North American B-25 Mitchell bombers when it was decided to send the B-26s to the Mediterranean Theatre.

== See also ==
- United States Army Air Forces in Australia (World War II)
- List of airports in Queensland
