= Great Northern Railway (Mt Isa line) =

Narrow gauge railway line in Queensland, Australia

Overview
- Other name: Mt Isa line

Technical
- Track gauge: 1,067 mm (3 ft 6 in)
- Signalling: DTC (except the first 20km from Stuart to Antill Plains)
- Train protection system: ATP (except the first 20km from Stuart to Antill Plains)

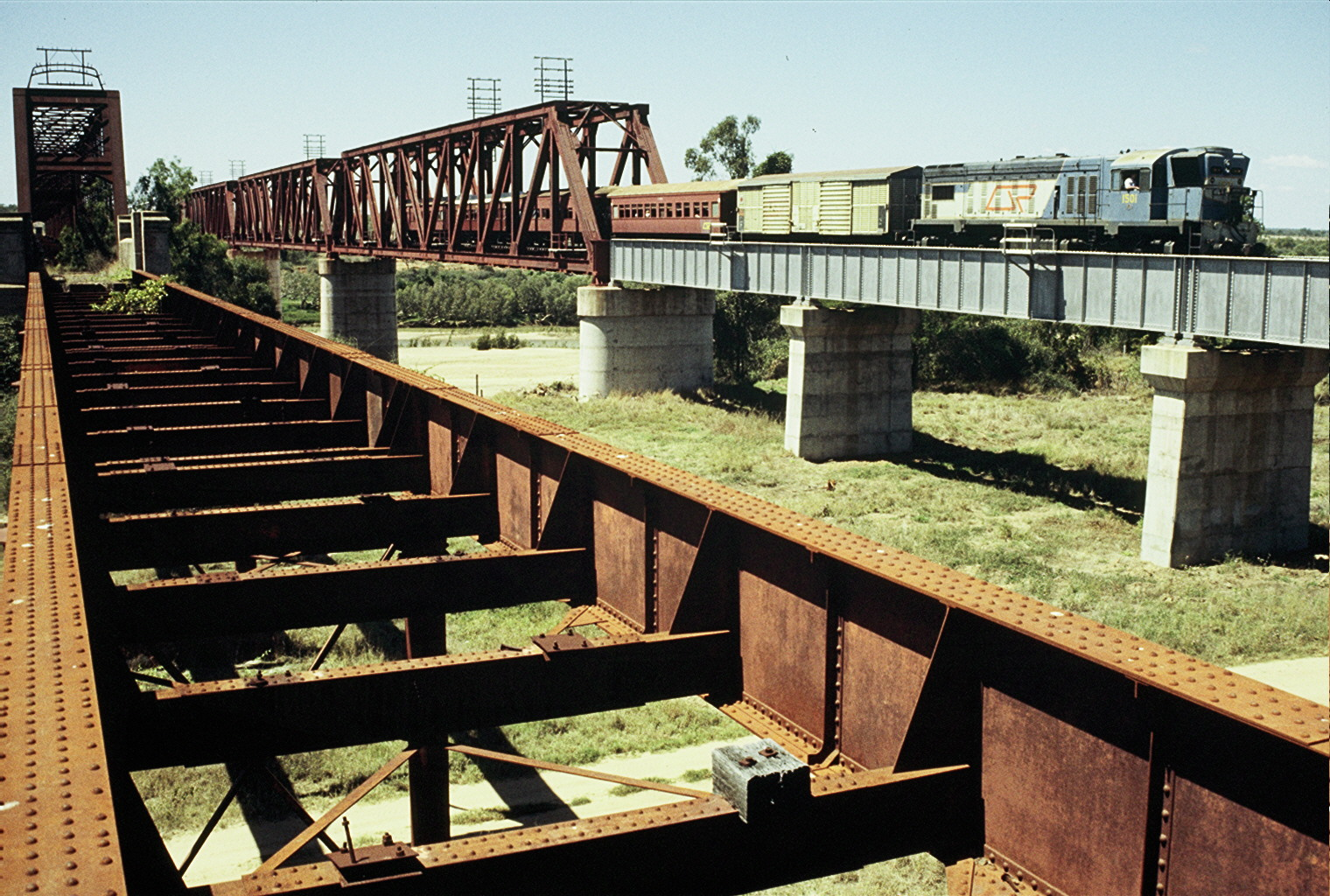
QR loco 1501 hauls a special train across the 1960s era Burdekin River bridge, September 1989. The original 1882, now disused bridge is in the foreground.

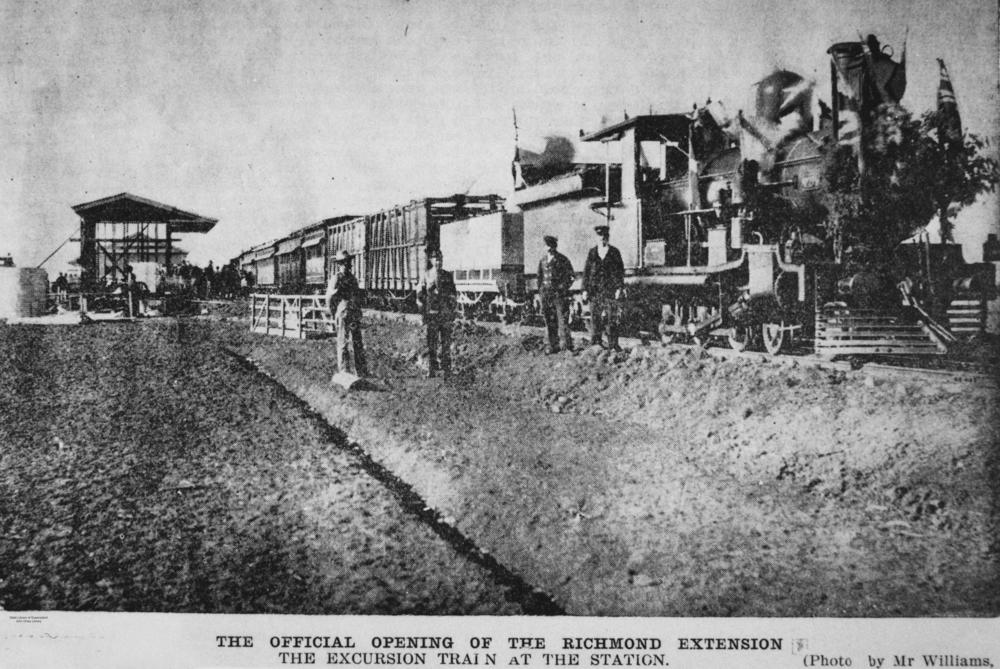
Celebration train for the extension to Richmond, 1904

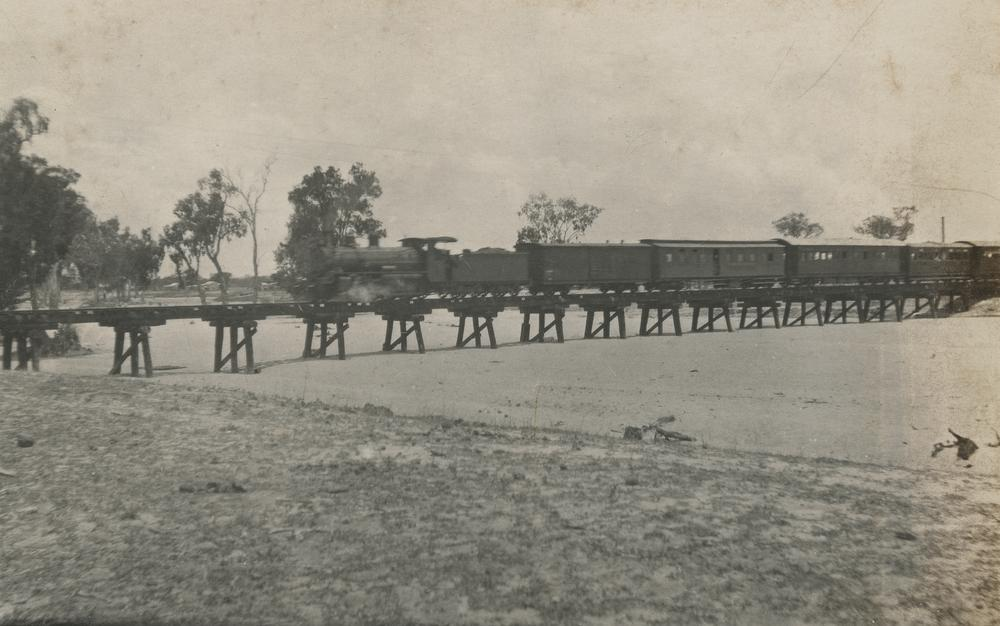
Train crossing a bridge at Homestead, situated between Charters Towers and Pentland ~1925

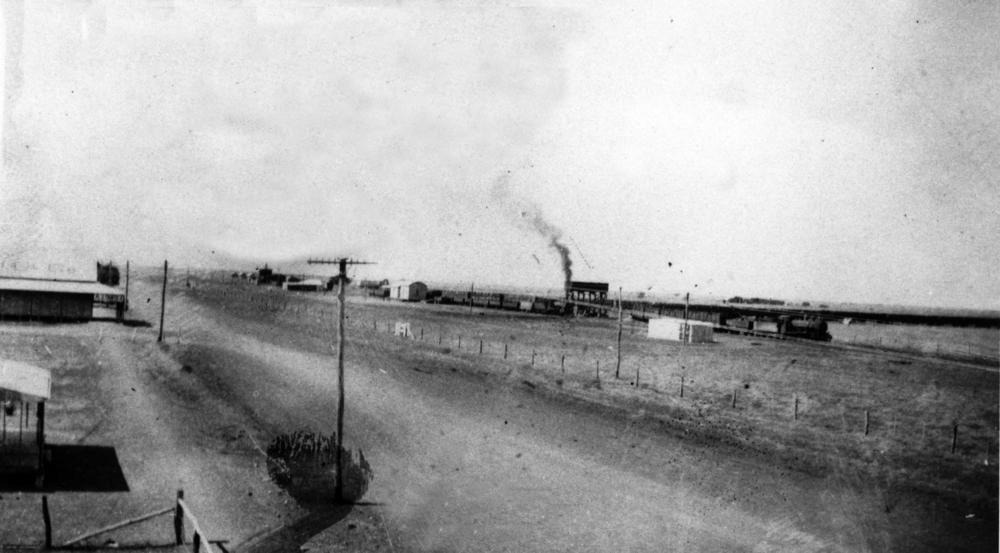
View of Julia Creek ~1928. Views of the Railway Station at Julia Creek looking east towards Richmond. A steam train is travelling towards Mount Isa. A.J. Smith's store can be seen on the left of the image (Description supplied with photograph)

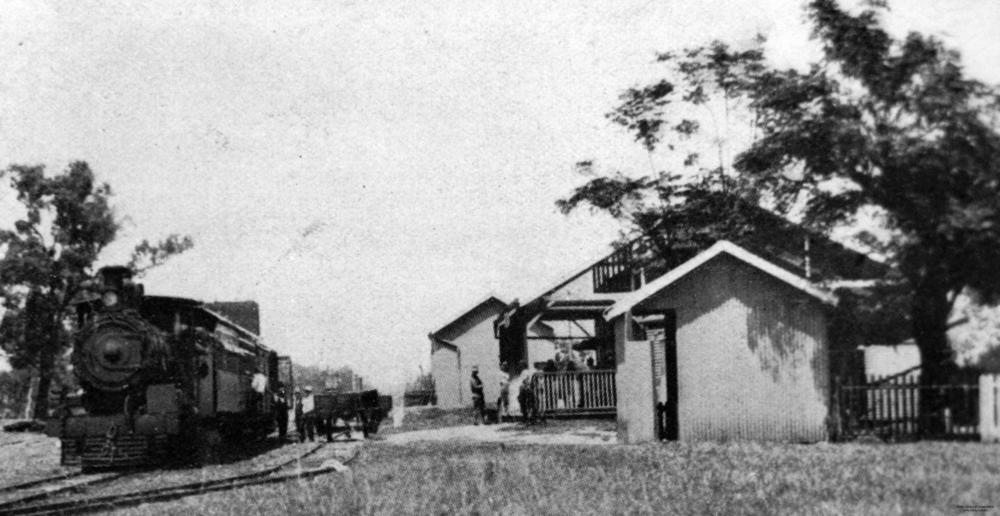
Hughenden mail train arrives at Pentland Railway Station, 1929

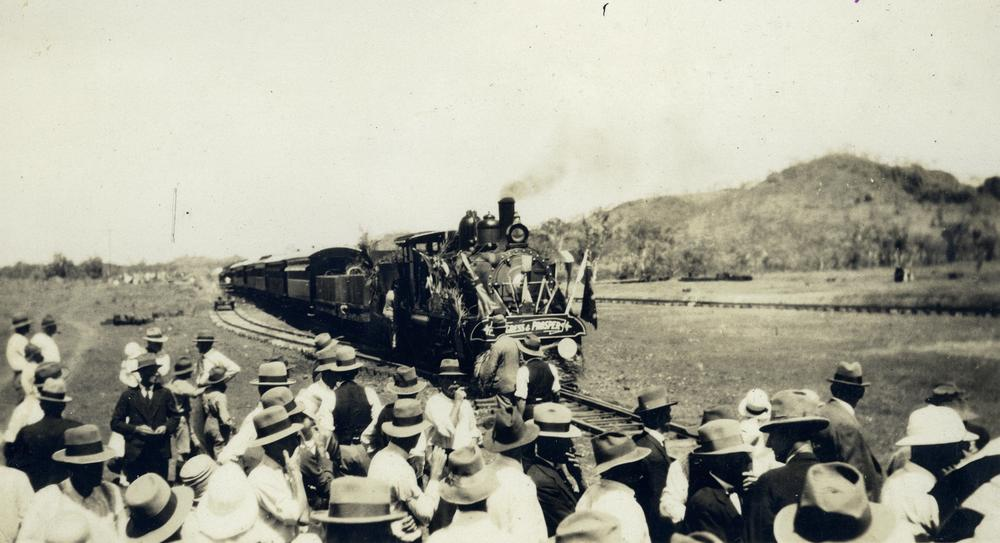
Greeting the official train at Mount Isa 1929

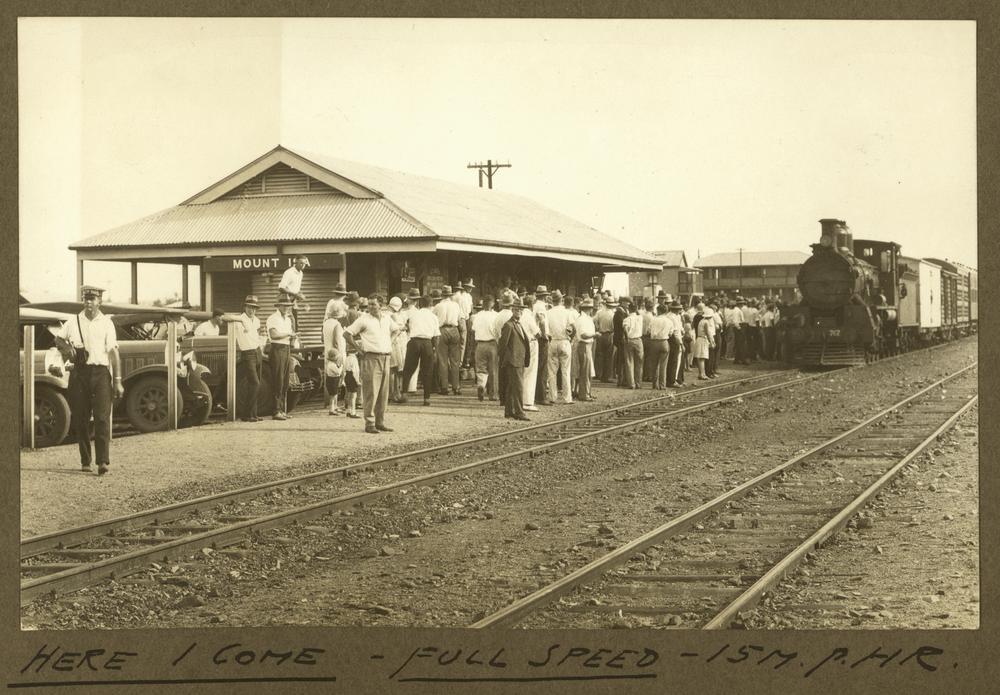
Train arriving at Mount Isa, 1931

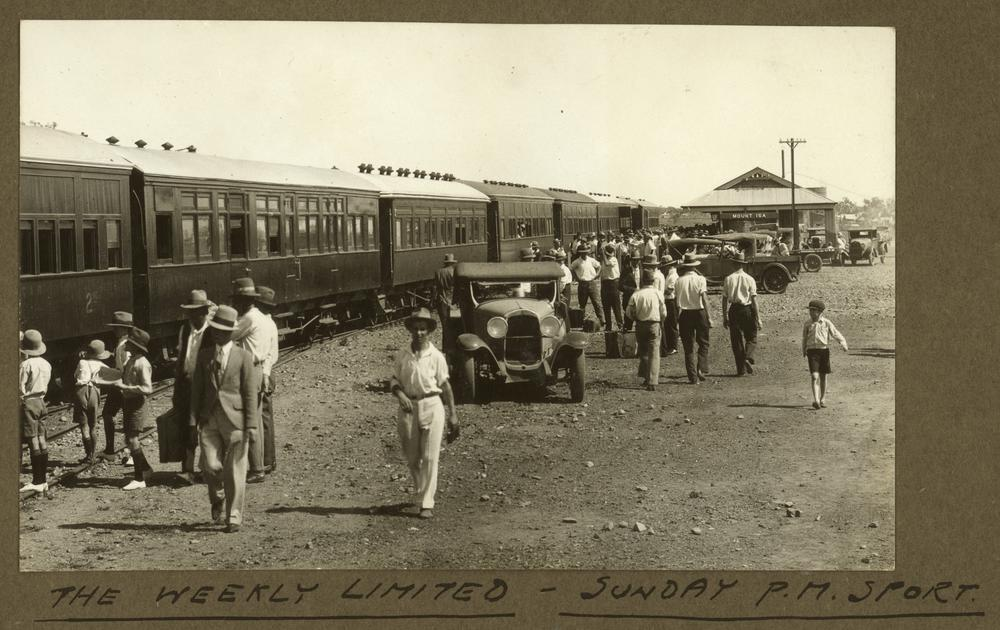
Arrival of the weekly Mail train, Mount Isa, 1931

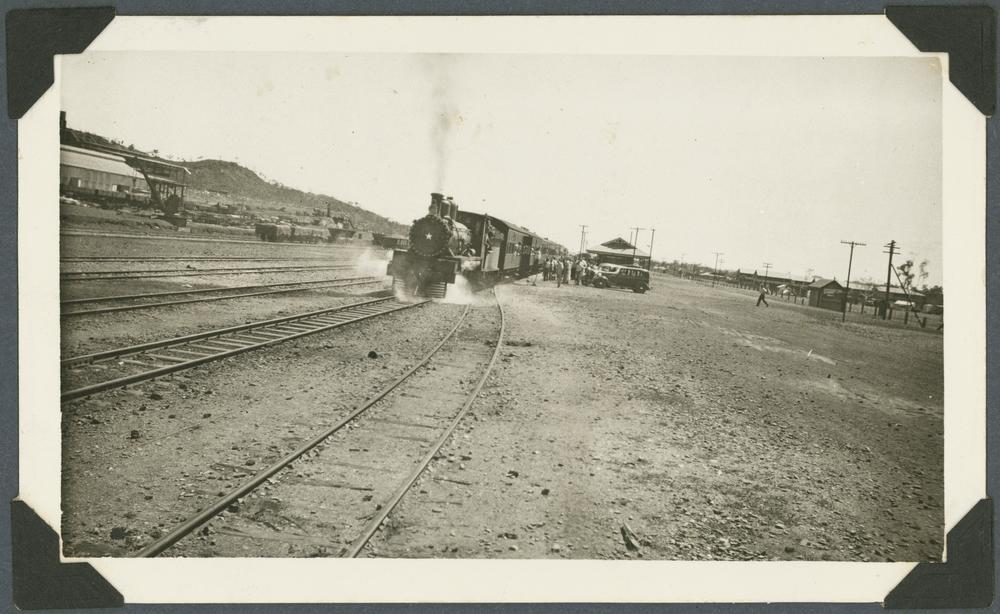
Departure of the Mount Isa train ~1937

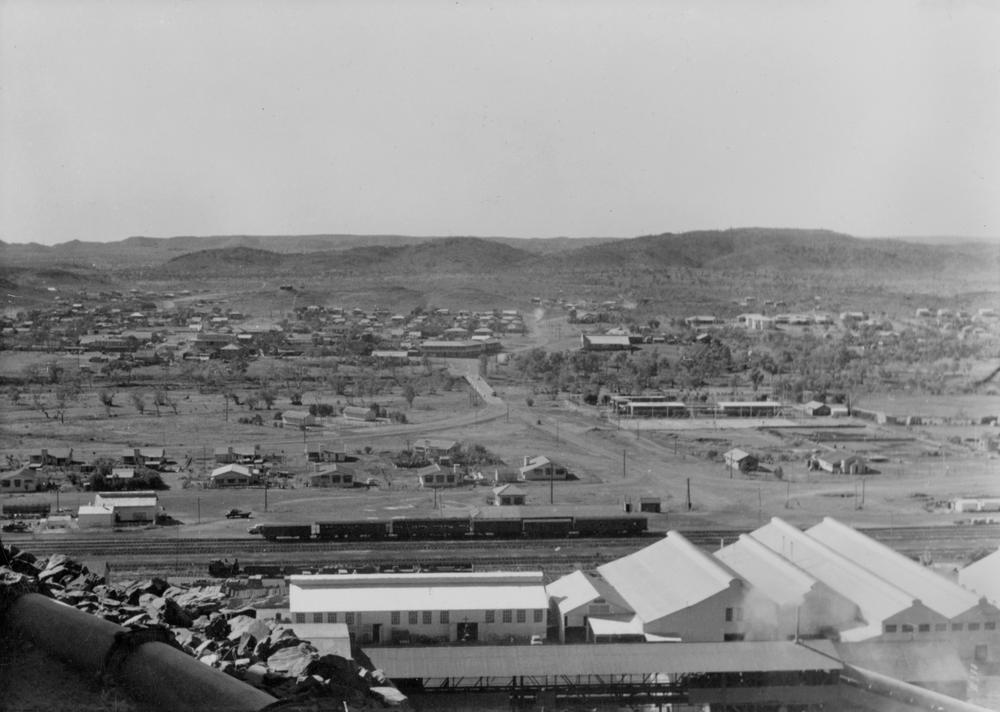
Looking over Mount Isa from the mine, 1953

The Great Northern Railway is a 1067 mm narrow-gauge railway line in Queensland, Australia. The line stretches nearly 1,000 kilometres linking the port city of Townsville, Australia to the mining town of Mount Isa in north-west Queensland. Along with a passenger service called the Inlander, it is a major freight route connecting the Mount Isa Mines to the Port of Townsville. In 2010, the line moved 5.8 million tonnes of cargo, and this is expected to increase significantly in coming years.

== History ==
Originally approved in 1877, its construction over nearly thirty years along with the building of other lines in Queensland was dictated by the pressing need to transport minerals and wool from isolated inland areas to the coast for shipment.

=== To the goldfields ===
In Townsville's case, it was given impetus by the discovery of gold at Ravenswood, Queensland and Charters Towers, Queensland in 1868 and 1872 respectively. The first section of the railway opened on 20 December 1880 and followed a southerly path to Reid River via small sidings at Stuart, Antill Plains, Toonpan, Woodstock and Calcium. The line then turned westward and climbed the Haughton Range using 1 in 25 (4%) grades and ~65 m (3.5 chain) radius curves in order to minimise construction costs. The line opened on 9 November 1881 to Ravenswood Junction (renamed Mingela in 1931 after closure of the Ravenswood branch railway). On 24 July 1882 the line opened to the Burdekin River at Macrossan (named after John Murtagh Macrossan) and via Sellheim reached Charters Towers railway station on 4 December 1882. Trains took more than five hours to cover roughly 140 kilometres from Townville.

The line proved so successful that the original Haughton Range section was deviated in 1887 with a 6 km line with 1 in 50 (2%) grades to improve the tonnage that could be hauled on the section. The original 1-in-25 alignment is now used by the Flinders Highway.

In 1899, the first bridge over the Burdekin River was replaced by the Burdekin River Rail Bridge designed by chief railway engineer, Henry Charles Stanley. Although replaced by a third bridge in 1964, the second bridge remains and is listed on the Queensland Heritage Register.

=== West for wool ===
In 1881, the Queensland Parliament approved a trebling of the line further west to Hughenden. The significant extension was again opened in stages – on 11 February 1884 to Homestead via sidings at Southern Cross, Powlathanga, Balfes Creek, Mungunburra and Thalanga; on 6 October 1884 to Pentland via Kimburra and Cape River; on 5 October 1885 to Torrens Creek via Warrigal and Burra; on 3 January 1887 to Prairie via Wareah and Karoon and, finally, on 19 October 1887 via Tindo, Jardine Valley and Poorooga sidings to Hughenden. The line proved very profitable and a daily mixed train took about thirteen hours to complete the journey from Old Townsville railway station.

Although by 1892, inland trunk routes extended as far west as Hughenden, Longreach, Queensland and Charleville, Queensland, those termini were still a long way from Queensland's western border and the State Government was keen to encourage settlement in the largely dry and remote central and southern far west. With this in mind, an extension from Hughenden south-west to Winton was approved in 1896 and 1897. Construction was undertaken in three stages. The line opened via Watten, Alba and Warianna sidings to Stamford on 13 December 1897, via Chinbi, Whitewood and Tarvano to Corfield (previously Manuka) on 15 October 1898 and via sidings at Olio, Lana, Prubi, Oondooroo and Rangelands to Winton on 5 July 1899. Winton passengers could make it to Townsville in about seventeen hours whilst an additional mixed service ran between Winton and Hughenden.

=== Further west to the copper fields ===
Cloncurry had been proposed as the destination of the railway from Normanton, but that was diverted to Croydon when gold was discovered there. The economic depression of the 1890s meant that the next proposal for a railway to Cloncurry was delayed by a decade.

Having linked Winton to Townsville, copper mining around Cloncurry and vast numbers of sheep and cattle prompted extension of the line directly west from Hughenden. First section constructed was the 110 km to Richmond in 1902. About two-thirds of the section opened to Marathon on 15 December 1903 with tiny sidings established at Ballindallock, Boree, Dunluce and Mumu. The speed on the line was limited to 10 miles per hour (16 km/h).

Only six months later on 1 June 1904, Richmond was reached via Barabon and Moselle. Transport of livestock, wool and passengers were thus connected to Townsville. Another extension of nearly 150 kilometres was approved to Julia Creek, Queensland in late 1905 and in December 1906 so too was the remaining 130 kilometres to Cloncurry.

Work did not get underway until September 1906 but proceeded rapidly, with temporary crossings of the dry river beds being made ahead of bridge construction so track laying was not delayed. In this arid region that was not a problem for most of the time, and explains the large time difference between the arrival of the first train and the official opening of a section.

85 km of rail that had been sent to Normanton and not used when the line was diverted to Croydon was used to construct part of the line that finally reached Cloncurry. It was railed from Croydon (where it had been stored) back to Normanton, then shipped around Cape York Peninsula to Townsville and railed to the new construction.

The first train ran to Julia Creek in June 1907 although the line officially opened on 29 February 1908. As before, sidings were installed at Gemoka (20.7336°S 142.8850°E), Maxwelton, Nonda, Nelia (20.6540°S 142.2134°E) and Quarells to serve nearby sheep and cattle stations.

Cloncurry welcomed its first train on 14 December 1907 but it was 13 December 1908 before the official opening took place. Sidings on this section were at Eddington, Gilliat, Tibarri, Bookin, Oorindi, Undina, Pymurra, Kaampa and Oonoomurra. The weekly mail train from Townsville took nearly twenty-four hours to reach Cloncurry.

=== Beyond Cloncurry ===
The route to later connect Cloncurry with Mount Isa was a creature of history. Any extension beyond Cloncurry was overwhelmingly to be dictated by mining interests. The first section went south, with the second section going south west and the final section going north west. Firstly came the Selwyn Branch Railway (Dajarra and Selwyn railway lines) that opened on 15 December 1910 and ran south from Cloncurry to the Hampden and Mt Elliott mines. Smelted copper was railed east and coking coal on return journeys. Cattle and coke also exchanged trips. Next in 1911, came construction work on the Dajarra Branch Railway south-west of the Selwyn Branch. It branched from the Selwyn branch at Malbon and opened to Duchess on 21 October 1912 and to Dajarra on 16 April 1917.

In 1923, vast silver and lead deposits were discovered at Mount Isa 121 kilometres by road from Cloncurry, 150 kilometres by road north of Dajarra but only 87 kilometres north of Duchess. There was an urgent need to connect rail to the area but the Government was reluctant to invest in what could be a limited life of operation. However the mining company guaranteed any losses on the line and construction began in 1926. Sidings appeared at Myubee, Woonigan, Kurbayia and Rifle Creek and the line opened at last on 27 May 1929. It brought construction of the Great Northern Railway to an end and gave Mount Isa a crucial link to the eastern seaboard. Contrary to the Government's doubt, the Mount Isa mine became one of the world's most successful operations that continues to this day.

=== Branch lines ===
Ravenswood Junction–Ravenswood Opened on 1 December 1884, the Ravenswood Branch ran via Kirk River some 39 kilometres from Ravenswood Junction to access silver mining operations to the south-east. Although silver smelting faltered in 1886, the line operated for more than forty years carrying passengers, cattle, minerals and firewood. The line closed on 6 November 1930, and the junction station was renamed Mingela. Most of its buildings and mining infrastructure are now classified by National Trust.

Hughenden–Winton Opened 1899, closed 2008, this was originally part of the Great Northern line until the section west of Hughenden became the main line.

Cloncurry–Mt Cuthbert (later Kajabbi) line opened between 1914–1917 to service mining areas. The Oona–Mt Cuthbert section closed in 1949, the Kajabbi–Dobbyn section in 1961 and Cloncurry–Kajabbi closed in 1994, having been a livestock transport line for the final 33 years.

Cloncurry–Selwyn Opened in 1910 to serve a mining area, it was funded 20% by the Hampton mine, 30% by the Mt Elliot mine and 50% by the government on the basis the line might be extended further west, which happened the following year from a junction at Malbon. The Cloncurry–Malbon section is now part of the main line. The Malbon - Selwyn branch closed in 1961.

Devoncourt–Ballara Built by the Hampton mine as a 35 km private line to the Wee Macgregor mine, it opened in 1915 and connected to a 3 km 610mm (2') gauge tramway. The ore was soon exhausted and the line closed in 1926.

Flynn–Phosphate Hill Opened in 1976 to serve a large deposit of phosphate rock for fertiliser. Built to main line standards with 47 kg/m rail and grades of 1 in 125 (0.8%).

Duchess–Dajarra Opened 1913–1917 as part of the Great Western Railway proposal, closed 1993.

Juenburra–Trekalano Opened 1918, a 12 km spur from the Dajarra line to serve a mine, closed 1943

=== 1980s deviation ===
In the 1980s, the second stage of the Ross River Dam necessitated a deviation of the Flinders Highway and the Mount Isa railway line (which previously ran straight north-south) to be relocated further east. This was completed by 1986 and resulted in the closure of Toonpan and Barringha railway stations on the removed route; they were not re-established on new route.

=== 2019 floods ===
In February 2019, flooding damaged 307 kilometres (191 mi) of track between Cloncurry and Hughenden with over 204 places suffering serious erosion and 16 bridges damaged. The repair work needed 100,000 cubic metres (3,500,000 cu ft) of ballast and 10,000 new sleepers. The flooding caused the derailment of a Pacific National freight train with 81 wagons at Nelia. A 1.2-kilometre (0.75 mi) rail deviation was constructed around the derailment.

=== 2022 derailments ===
In July 2022, the line was closed for approximately ten days following a derailment of a containerised freight train between Nonda and Neila. During the derailment, wagons damaged nine kilometres of track when they came off the rails but remained upright.

The following month, a freight train rear-ended another at Oonoomurra, which closed the line for a second time. The line closure prompted mining companies to use road trains to transport their freight products along the Flinders Highway, prompting safety concerns.

== Services ==
When the line reached Hughenden in 1887, the journey by mixed train from Townsville took 12 hours 45 minutes. When the line was extended to Winton, 3 mail trains per week ran, taking 17 hours.

When the Hughenden-Cloncurry line opened, the mail train took that route and Winton service became a sleeper attached to the connecting train.

A Travelling Post Office was introduced in 1899, and remained part of the consist of the mail train until 1932, when it was removed as an economy measure.

One of the first buffet cars was introduced in 1912, attached at Mingela to save hauling it up the Haughton Range.

In 1929, the Mt Isa Mail (including Dining Car) made the weekly run from Townsville in 30 hours. That year 41,000 ton of coal was railed to Mt Isa, and 38,000 ton of lead bullion was railed out.

The first air-conditioned train in Queensland (including the first air-conditioned sleeping cars in Australia), the Inlander was introduced in February 1953, bringing a new level of comfort and cleanliness to a hot and dusty area of the State. As of 2018, the Inlander takes 21 hours to complete the journey from Townsville to Mt Isa.

== Contemporary role ==
Today known as the Mt Isa line by Queensland Rail, the line continues to predominantly service mineral traffic. Constructed as a development line, it was upgraded in the 1960s to main line standard. A deviation east of Mingela eased the grade from 1 in 50 (2%) to 1 in 90 (1.1%), and other deviations were made to increase the flood resistance of the line, especially between Cloncurry and Duchess.

A major advantage of the line was the efficient use of wagons, hauling coal west to Mt Isa and metal ingots east for export. When the Mica Creek Power Station was converted to gas fuel in 2000, some of the coal traffic ceased, adversely affecting wagon efficiency.

== See also ==
- List of tramways in Queensland
