= Woodstock, Queensland =

Woodstock
- Town
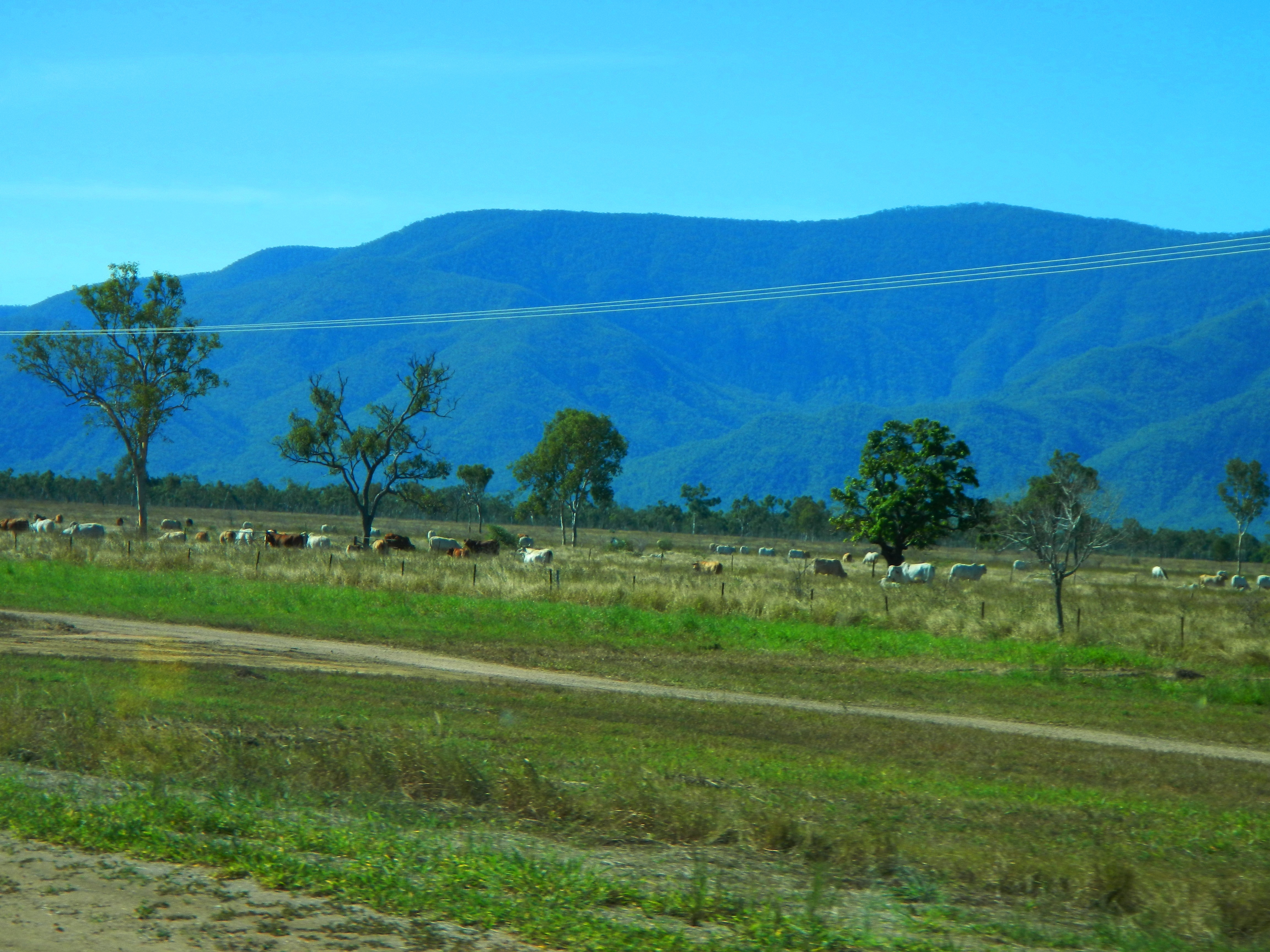
- Woodstock landscape, 2013

- Interactive map of Woodstock
- Coordinates: 19.5961°S 146.8352°E
- Country: Australia
- State: Queensland
- LGA: City of Townsville
- Location: 41.0 km (25.5 mi) S of Townsville CBD; 1,346 km (836 mi) NNW of Brisbane

Government
  - State electorate: Burdekin
  - Federal division: Kennedy

Area
  - Total: 216.7 km^{2} (83.7 sq mi)

Population
  - Total: 270 (2021 census)
  - Density: 1.246/km^{2} (3.23/sq mi)
- Time zone: UTC+10:00 (AEST)
- Postcode: 4816
Localities around Woodstock
Barringha	Barringha	Majors Creek
Granite Vale	Woodstock	Majors Creek
Calcium	Reid River	Upper Haughton

Woodstock is a rural town and locality in the City of Townsville, Queensland, Australia. In the 2021 census, the locality of Woodstock had a population of 270 people.

== Geography ==
Woodstock is 40 kilometres (25 mi) south of Townsville.

The area in the head of the catchments for the Ross River. The Ross River Dam is a major source of water for Townsville and the Majors Creek/Upper Haughton area.

There is a substation at Woodstock to boost power to the area and it feeds into the Kelso substation in the Upper Ross area of Townsville. It will be the connection point for the CopperString project which will link Townsville to Mount Isa.

== History ==
The town takes its name from the Woodstock pastoral run, which was named in 1863, by Mark Watt Reid, station manager for pastoralist John Melton Black.

Woodstock Provisional School opened in September 1890. On 1 January 1909, it became Woodstock State School. The preschool burnt down around Christmas 2004. In 2015, Woodstock State School celebrated its 125th anniversary.

Manton Provisional School opened on 1 October 1903. In 1908, it reported an average daily attendance of 11.8 students. It become Manton State School on 1 January 1909. In 1920, it began to operate as a half-time school in conjunction with Toonpan Provisional School (meaning one teacher was shared between the two schools). It returned to full-time school status in 1923. Due to low student numbers, it closed in October 1924, but reopened in 1928, closing again in 1930. The school reopened in 1934 with 14 students. It closed permanently on 18 August 1946 . The school was on a 5-acre (2.0 ha) site at 4073 Burdekin Highway (now Flinders Highway, 19.65338°S 146.83664°E).

Woodstock and its large surrounding area was in Thuringowa until 1994 when a change in local government boundaries resulted in this part of Thuringowa being incorporated into City of Townsville.

== Demographics ==
In the 2016 census, the locality of Woodstock had a population of 239 people.

In the 2021 census, the locality of Woodstock had a population of 270 people.

== Education ==
Woodstock State School is a government primary (Prep–6) school for boys and girls on Woodstock Avenue (19.5980°S 146.8351°E). In 2017, the school had an enrolment of 60 students with 7 teachers (4 full-time equivalent) and 5 non-teaching staff (3 full-time equivalent).

There are no secondary schools in Woodstock. The nearest government secondary schools are William Ross State High School in Annandale, Townsville, to the north and Home Hill State High School in Home Hill to the east.

== Amenities ==
The Woodstock branch of the Queensland Country Women's Association meets at the QCWA Hall at 42 Woodstock Avenue.

The Woodstock Motocross track opened in 1925. It has a dirt track made of decomposed granite, enabling fast riding.

== Transport ==
Woodstock's main center is located on the Flinders Highway where the Woodstock–Giru Road and the old Flinders Highway meet the current Flinders Highway.

Local school buses run from Reid River to Woodstock and from Toonpan to Woodstock during schools days taking the local children to the Woodstock School and another local bus runs from Reid River to William Ross High School (Townsville) for the High school Children.

Woodstock has its own airport, listed as Woodstock Airport it is better known as Donnington Airpark. The area supports a number of private airstrips.

The Western rail line bisects the area (the line between Townsville and Mount Isa). The area is also dissected by gas and water pipelines.
