= Granite Vale, Queensland =

Granite Vale
- Suburb
- Interactive map of Granite Vale
- Coordinates: 19.5805°S 146.6399°E
- Country: Australia
- State: Queensland
- LGA: City of Townsville
- Location: 33.8 km (21.0 mi) SSW of Condon; 38.0 km (23.6 mi) SSW of Kirwan; 53.6 km (33.3 mi) SSW of Townsville CBD; 1,388 km (862 mi) NNW of Brisbane

Government
  - State electorates: Burdekin; Thuringowa
  - Federal division: Kennedy

Area
  - Total: 458.7 km^{2} (177.1 sq mi)
- Elevation: 60–610 m (200–2,000 ft)

Population
  - Total: 0 (2021 census)
  - Density: 0.0000/km^{2} (0.0000/sq mi)
- Time zone: UTC+10:00 (AEST)
- Postcode: 4815
Suburbs around Granite Vale
Alice River	Pinnacles	Barringha
Hervey Range	Granite Vale	Woodstock
Dotswood	Reid River	Calcium

Granite Vale is a rural locality in the City of Townsville, Queensland, Australia. In the 2021 census, Granite Vale had "no people or a very low population".

== Geography ==
The locality is bounded by the ridge of the Hervey Range (19.6°S 146.55°E) to the west. The land falls steeply from the western ridge from 610 metres (2,000 ft) above sea level towards the east down to 70 metres (230 ft) above sea level. There are a number of named peaks in the locality (from north to south):

- Wild Horse Mountain (19.4327°S 146.6058°E) at 508 metres (1,667 ft) above sea level
- Wallaroo Hill (19.5286°S 146.6530°E) at 251 metres (823 ft) above sea level
- Springs Hill (19.5556°S 146.6863°E) at 290 metres (950 ft) above sea level
- Pepper Pot Mountain (19.5601°S 146.6632°E) at 525 metres (1,722 ft) above sea level
- Ross River Mountain (19.6108°S 146.6768°E) at 589 metres (1,932 ft) above sea level
- Gibraltar (19.6166°S 146.6°E) at 465 metres (1,526 ft) above sea level
- Peach Hollow Knobs (19.6613°S 146.5947°E) at 601 metres (1,972 ft) above sea level

There is a small section of the Pinnacles National Park in the north-west of the locality but most of the national park is in the neighbouring locality of Hervey Range. There is a small section of the Mingela State Forest in the south-east of the locality but the forest is predominantly in neighbouring Calcium.

Settlement Pocket is a neighbourhood in the centre of the locality (19.5833°S 146.65°E) near Settlement Creek.

Peach Hollow is a neighbourhood in the south of the locality (19.65°S 146.6333°E) near the Reid River.

The Springs is a natural spring (19.5333°S 146.7°E).

The land use is predominantly grazing on native vegetation.

== History ==
The locality was named and bounded on 27 July 1991.

== Demographics ==
In the 2016 census, Granite Vale had "no people or a very low population".

In the 2021 census, Granite Vale had "no people or a very low population".

== Education ==
There are no schools in Granite Vale. The nearest government primary school is The Willows State School in Kirwan to the north-east. The nearest government secondary school is Thuringowa State High School in Condon to the north-east.
