= Kelso, Queensland =

Kelso
- Suburb
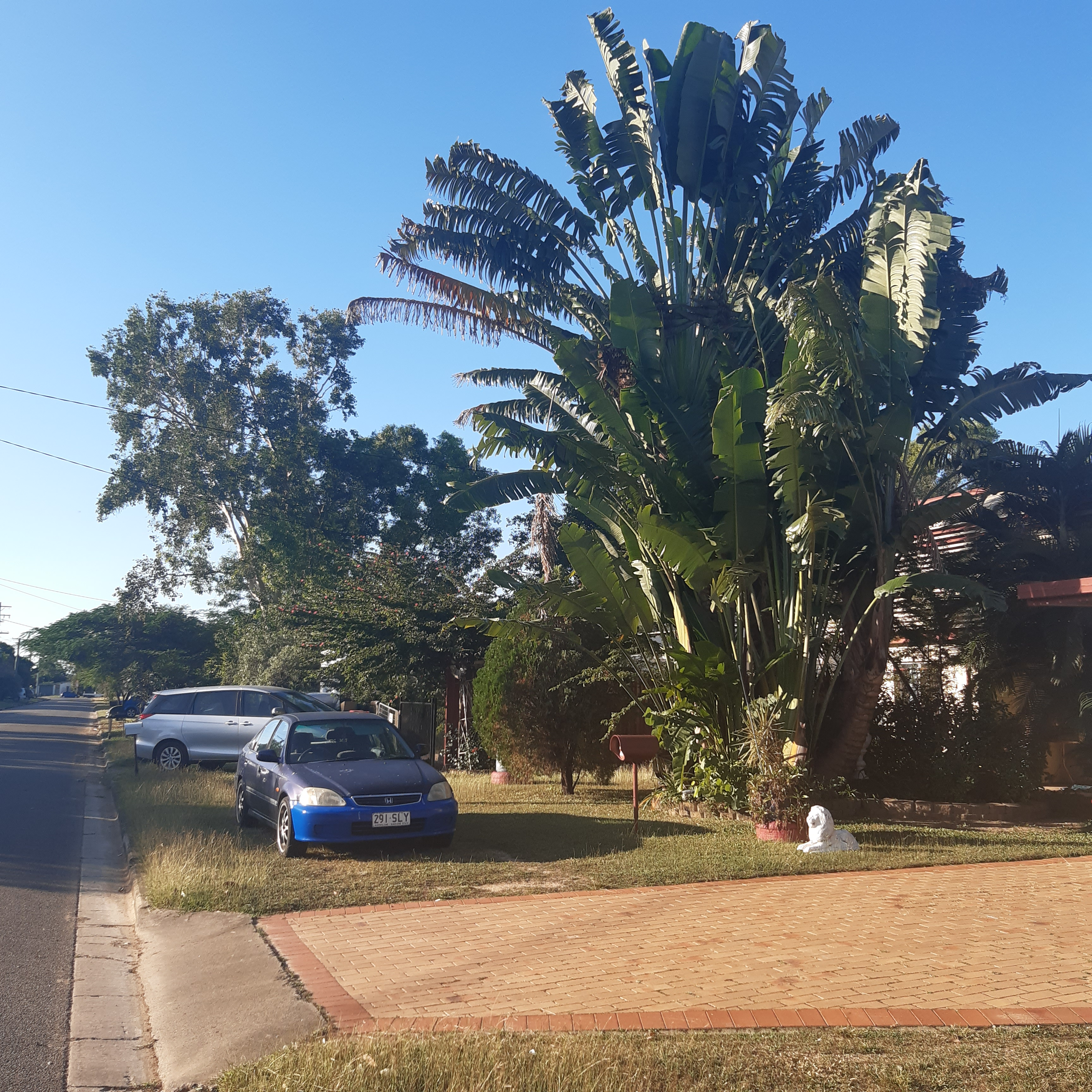
- A suburban street in Kelso

- Interactive map of Kelso
- Coordinates: 19.3899°S 146.7166°E
- Country: Australia
- State: Queensland
- City: Townsville
- LGA: City of Townsville
- Location: 19.6 km (12.2 mi) SW of Townsville CBD; 1,363 km (847 mi) NNW of Brisbane

Government
  - State electorate: Thuringowa
  - Federal divisions: Herbert; Kennedy

Area
  - Total: 17.2 km^{2} (6.6 sq mi)

Population
  - Total: 10,599 (2021 census)
  - Density: 616.2/km^{2} (1,596/sq mi)
- Time zone: UTC+10:00 (AEST)
- Postcode: 4815
Suburbs around Kelso
Gumlow	Rasmussen	Mount Stuart
Gumlow	Kelso	Mount Stuart
Pinnacles	Pinnacles	Ross River

Kelso is a suburb in the City of Townsville, Queensland, Australia. In the 2021 census, Kelso had a population of 10,599 people.

== Geography ==
Kelso is the last of three suburbs along Riverway Drive and is the only suburb on Riverway Drive that has homes backing onto the Ross River.

Garbutt–Upper Ross Road (Riverway Drive) runs from north to south inside the eastern boundary.

== History ==
Kelso was named after Scottish immigrants, and early settlers, Mary and James Kelso, who had cattle property in 1878 called Laudham Park on Five Head Creek. To make way for construction of the Ross River Dam in 1970, the Townsville City Council resumed 1620ha of the property's best grazing land. At its peak, Laudham Park stretched for more than 40,000ha along both banks of the Upper Ross River to the foothills of Mount Stuart and out to the Pinnacles part of Hervey Range. Most of what was Laudham Park is today under water due to the construction of the dam and the rest is now the suburb of Kelso. The first residential blocks started selling back in 1966.

Kelso State School, Prep to Year 6, opened in 1963.

== Demographics ==
In the 2016 census, Kelso had a population of 10,538 people. Aboriginal and Torres Strait Islander people made up 12.0% of the population. 82.4% of people were born in Australia. The next most common countries of birth were England 2.2% and New Zealand 2.2%. 88.4% of people spoke only English at home. The most common responses for religion were No Religion 29.1%, Catholic 25.9% and Anglican 17.2%.

In the 2021 census, Kelso had a population of 10,599 people.

== Education ==
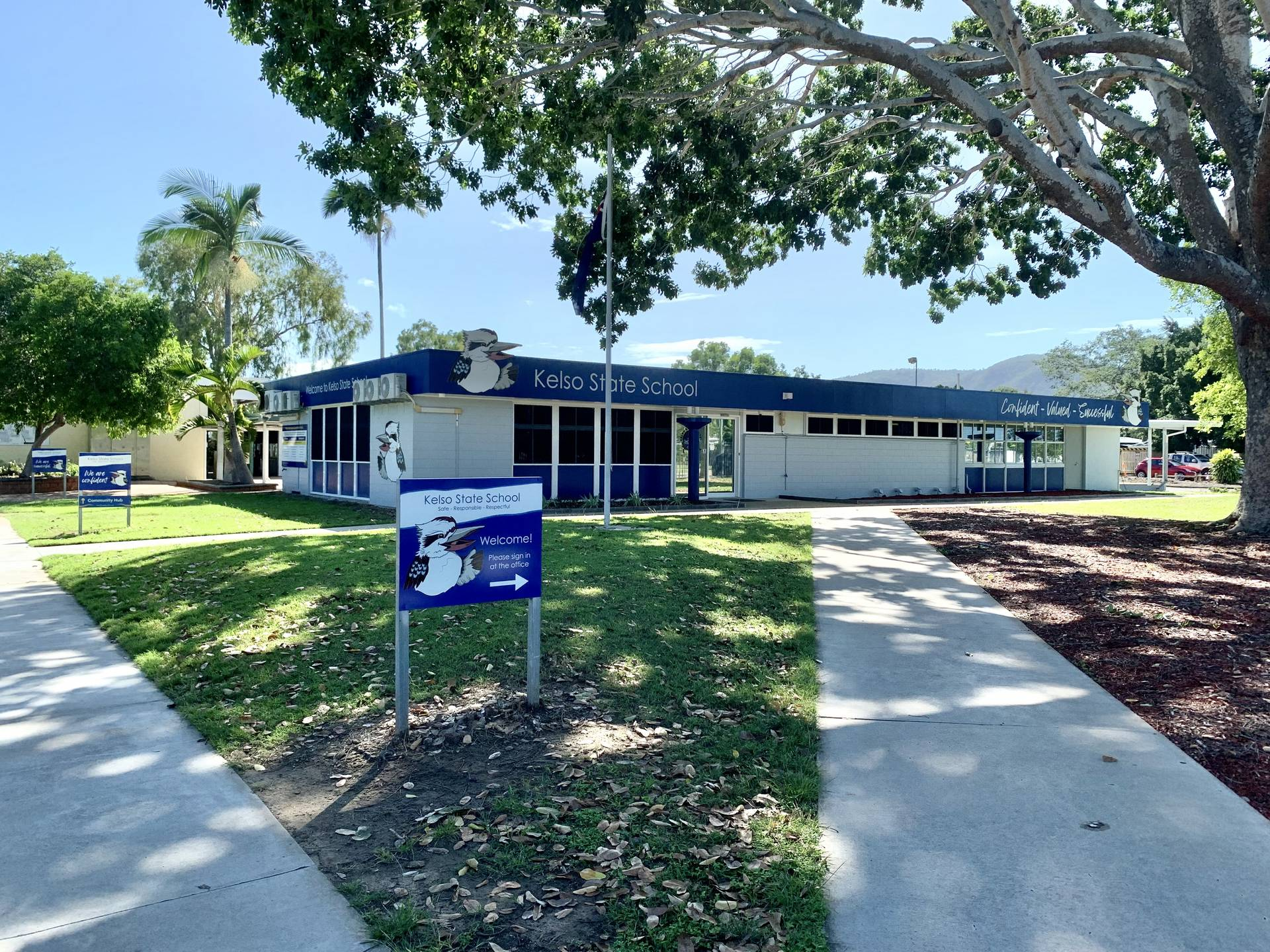
Kelso State School administration block, 2023

Kelso State School is a government primary (Prep–6) school for boys and girls at Yvette Street (19.3886°S 146.7264°E). In 2018, the school had an enrolment of 549 students with 35 teachers (34 full-time equivalent) and 21 non-teaching staff (17 full-time equivalent).

There are no secondary schools in Kelso. The nearest government secondary school is Thuringowa State High School in Condon to the north.

== Transportation ==
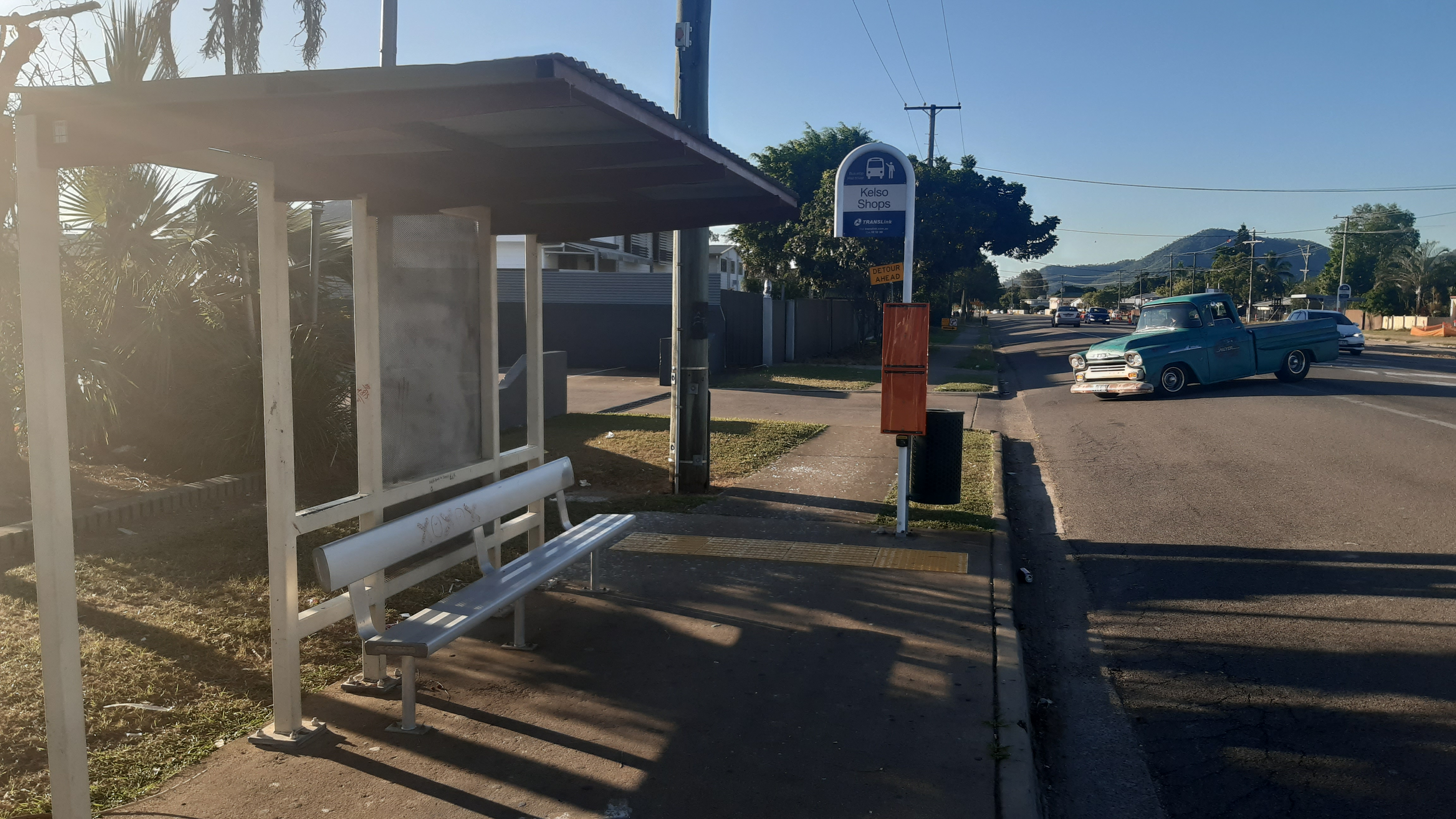
The bus stop at Kelso Shopping Centre

Kelso is connected to Townsville by the Kinetic Townsville bus services.
