= Reid River, Queensland =

Reid River
- Suburb
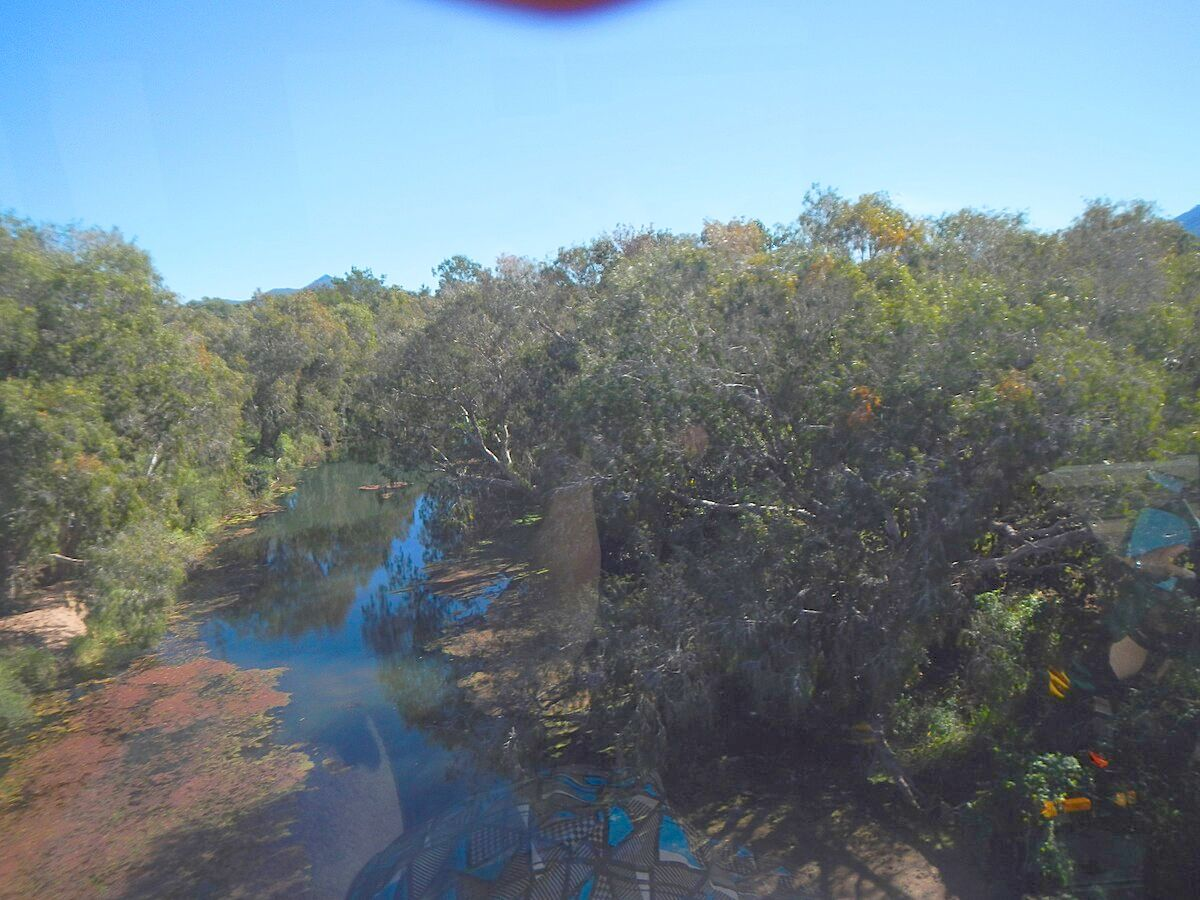
- Crossing the Reid River, 2013

- Interactive map of Reid River
- Coordinates: 19.76°S 146.8519°E
- Country: Australia
- State: Queensland
- LGAs: Charters Towers Region; City of Townsville
- Location: 50.3 km (31.3 mi) N of Annandale; 55.7 km (34.6 mi) N of Townsville CBD; 1,349 km (838 mi) NNW of Brisbane

Government
  - State electorates: Traeger; Burdekin
  - Federal division: Kennedy

Area
  - Total: 403.0 km^{2} (155.6 sq mi)

Population
  - Total: 143 (2021 census)
  - Density: 0.3548/km^{2} (0.919/sq mi)
- Time zone: UTC+10:00 (AEST)
- Postcode: 4816
Suburbs around Reid River
Dotswood	Granite Vale; Calcium	Woodstock
Dotswood	Reid River	Upper Haughton
Mingela	Mingela	Ravenswood

Reid River is a rural locality split between the Charters Towers Region and the City of Townsville in Queensland, Australia. In the 2021 census, Reid River had a population of 143 people.

== Geography ==
The Haughton River forms the south-eastern boundary. The Reid River flows through from west to south-east where it joins the Haughton.

The Flinders Highway runs through from north to south.

The Great Northern Railway enters the locality from the north (Calcium/Woodstock) and exits to the south (Mingela/Ravenswood).

Reid River has the following mountains (from west to east):

- Plant Hill (19.7092°S 146.8475°E) 308 metres (1,010 ft)
- Cameron Hill (19.7440°S 146.8591°E) 327 metres (1,073 ft)
- Footes Hill (19.7451°S 146.9197°E) 237 metres (778 ft)
- Boundary Hill (19.7650°S 146.9443°E) 226 metres (741 ft)

== History ==
The locality takes its name from the river which was named about 1864 after explorer Mark Watt Reid.

The Reid River Airfield was established for use in World War II at 19.7625°S 146.8444°E.

Haughton Valley Provisional School opened circa 1885 and closed in 1891. Reid River Provisional School opened in 1892; it is unclear if this is a different school or a renaming of the Haughton Valley school. On 1 January 1909, it became Reid River State School. It closed on 31 December 1966.

== Demographics ==
In the 2016 census, Reid River had a population of 115 people.

In the 2021 census, Reid River had a population of 143 people.

== Education ==
There are no schools in Reid River. The nearest government primary schools are Woodstock State School in neighbouring Woodstock to the north-east and Clare State School in Clare to the east. The nearest government secondary school is William Ross State High School in Annandale, Townsville.
