= Ross River (Queensland) =

Ross
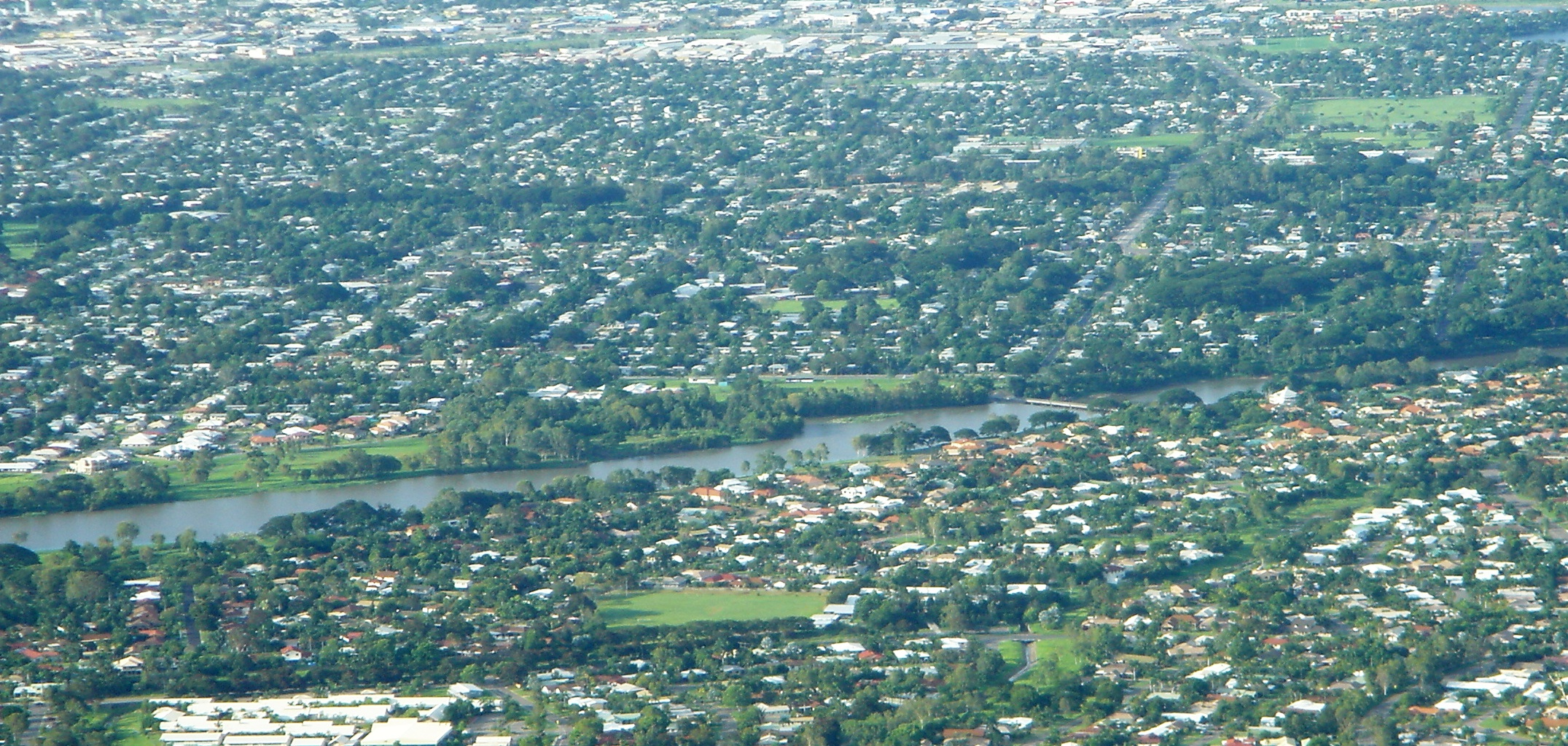
- Ross River as it runs through Townsville suburbs, with Aplins Weir visible on right

- Location of Ross River river mouth in Queensland
- Etymology: W. A. Ross, a colonial settler

Location
- Country: Australia
- State: Queensland
- Region: North Queensland
- City: Townsville

Physical characteristics
- Source: Hervey Range
  - location: below Pepper Pot Mountain
  - coordinates: 19°34′07″S 146°43′12″E
  - elevation: 92 m (302 ft)
- Mouth: Coral Sea
  - location: South Townsville
  - coordinates: 19°15′25″S 146°50′58″E
  - elevation: 0 m (0 ft)
- Length: 49 km (30 mi)
- Basin size: 1,340 km^{2} (520 sq mi) to 917.1 km^{2} (354.1 sq mi)
- Discharge
  - location: Near mouth
  - average: 9.3 m^{3}/s (290 GL/a)

Basin features
- Tributaries
  - left: Ross Creek, Goondi Creek
  - right: Stuart Creek
- Reservoirs: Black Weir; Gleeson's Weir; Aplin's Weir; Ross River Dam

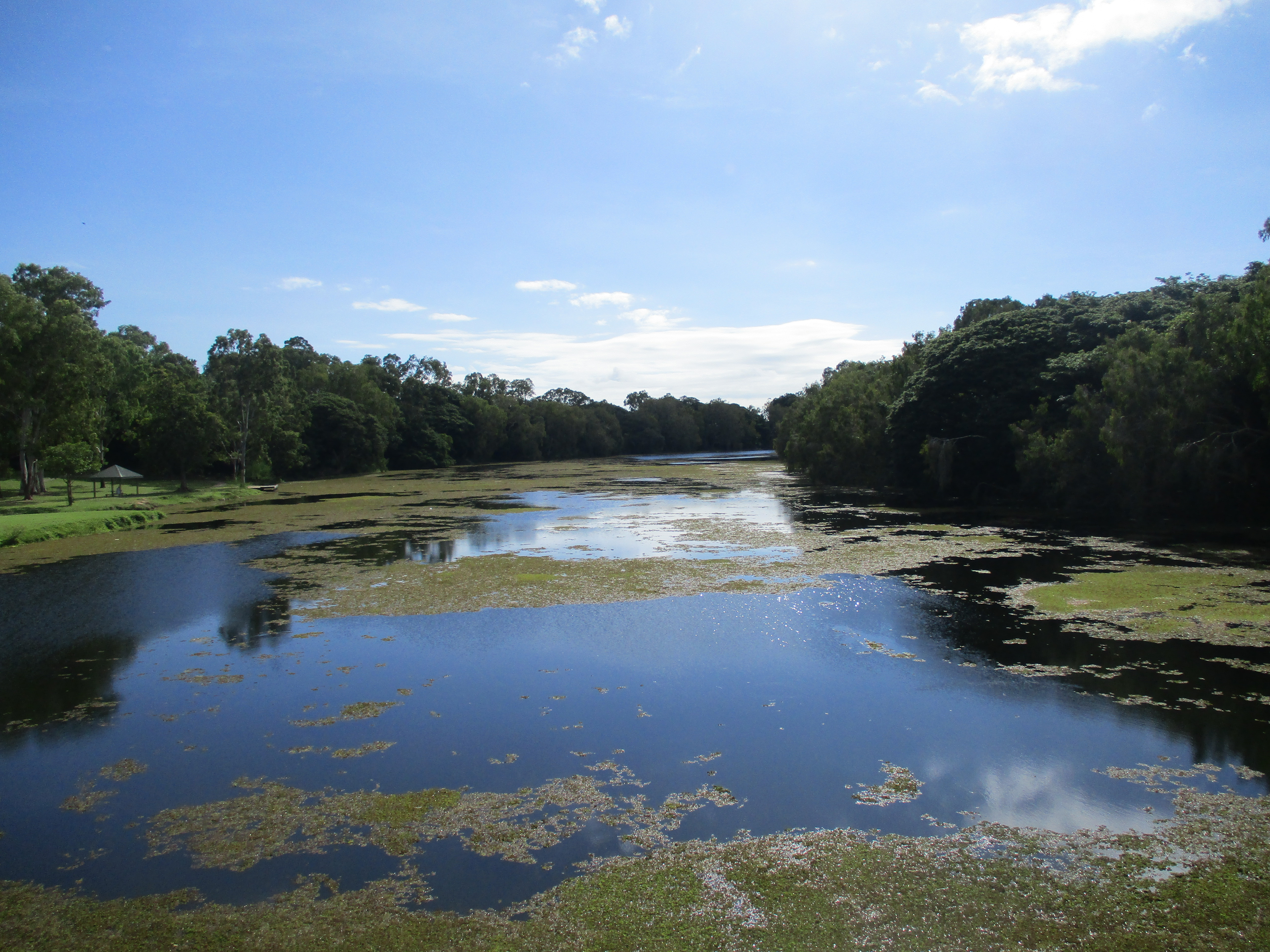
Ross River, below the Weir Dam

The Ross River is a river in North Queensland, Australia. The 49-kilometre (30 mi) long river flows through the city of Townsville and empties into the Coral Sea. It is the major waterway flowing through Townsville and the city's main source of drinking water.

The river is named in 1864 after William Alfred Ross (-1887), first publican of the settlement who later became a mayor of Townsville in 1868.

== Course and features ==
The river rises in the Hervey Range below Pepper Pot Mountain and flows generally north through Lake Ross, across a flat coastal plain and east around Mount Stuart into Townsville city. The Ross River flows across the Townsville suburbs of Aitkenvale, Annandale, Condon, Kelso, Mundingburra, Murray and Rasmussen. The river is joined by three minor tributaries including Ross Creek, before reaching its mouth south east of Townsville. This area is currently being developed into a marina precinct. Flow rates in the river are controlled by the Ross River Dam, the largest dam in the catchment. There are seven crossings over the river and three weirs exist along the river. The river has a catchment area of 1,340 square kilometres (517 sq mi) of which an area of 102 square kilometres (39 sq mi) is composed of estuarine wetlands.

== Ross River Parkway ==
The Ross River Parkway is a series of parks, community facilities and pedestrian bridges which stretch from The Vickers Bridge (formerly the Twin Cities Bridge), Douglas to Rooney's Bridge, Railway Estate which are interlinked by more than 30 kilometres (19 mi) of shared use pathways. The parkway is used for recreation by many people who exercise or play in the parkland or along the network of paths, but was also designed to provide a safe network of paths to link the Townsville central business district to outlying suburbs. The parkway was developed over a series of years with funding from the Townsville City Council and Queensland Government and linked a series of existing parks, paths and bridges together. Notable facilities in the Ross River Parkway include Riverway, Tony Ireland Stadium, Riverside Lodge, Rossiter Park, The Palmetum, Aplin's Weir Rotary Park, Bicentennial Park and Black, Gleeson's and Aplin's Weirs.

== Weirs ==
=== Black Weir ===
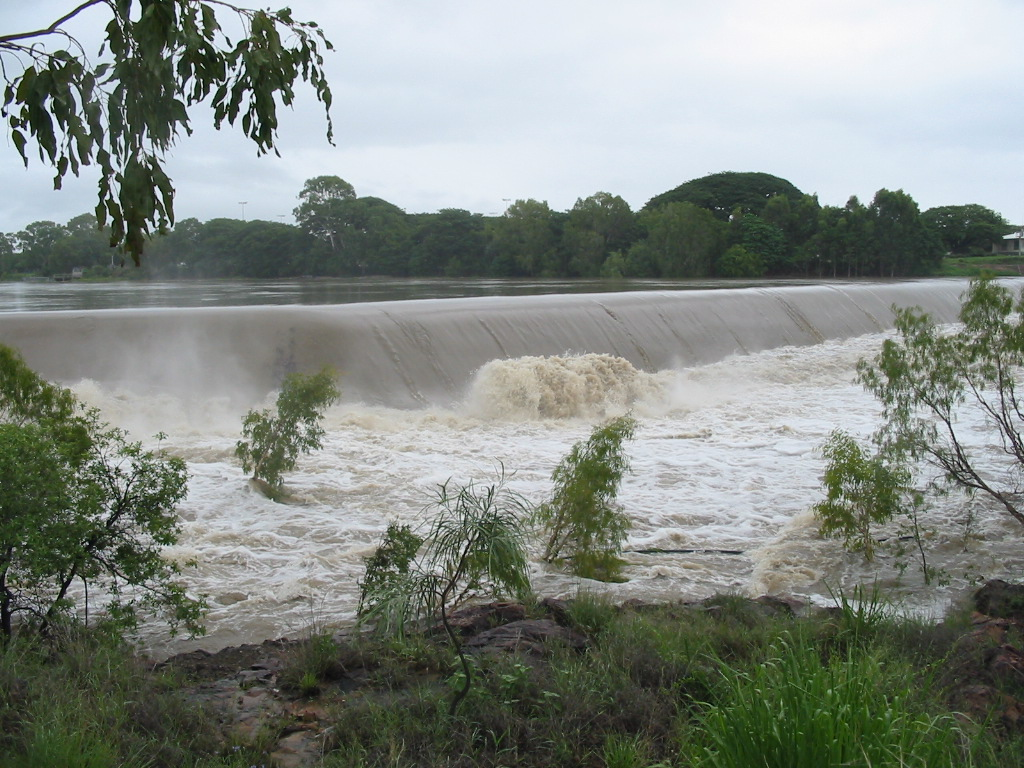
Black Weir 1.2 metres (3 ft 11 in) over in 2007

Black Weir, formerly Black School Weir, is the most upstream weir of those on Ross River. Built in the early 1930s, Black Weir is a hollow buttress weir with an ogee shaped face on the downstream side, a sloped face on the upstream face and stone pitched abutments. The weir's name is derived from the name of Black School that abutted Ross River near the location of weir when it was constructed. Following damage to the weir due to flooding, the weir underwent major renovations in 1934. These renovations included the addition of a second pump well, the addition of further buttresses and the underpinning of the original structure. It took until 1936 to fill the reservoir behind the weir, but only provided a few years water supply. During World War II the large influxes of population as a result of Townsville's heavy military presence necessitated the provision of more water. In 1940 a galvanized iron wall was erected atop Black Weir to provide additional storage capacity to supplement the town's water supply. This continued for many years in order to provide additional water which could be pumped from the weir.

=== Gleeson's Weir ===
Gleeson's Weir crosses the Ross River between the Townsville suburbs of Cranbrook and Douglas. It was the first built of three weirs in the Ross River. Built downstream of Gleeson's Farm, its namesake, the weir was completed in 1908 as part of the damming process to secure and stabilise water supply for local residents. This weir could potentially store 410 megalitres (14×10^{6} cu ft) of water. However, water was not pumped from the reservoir above Gleeson's Weir until approximately 1923 due to the necessity to release water to downstream aquifers.

=== Aplin's Weir ===
Aplin's Weir lies downstream of Gleeson's Weir and is the last weir before the mouth of the river. Aplin's Weir started out as small stop weir, built in 1927 to prevent incursion of salt water into the water supplies pumped from the upstream Top River wells, located at the end of Thompson Street, Mundingburra. The original stop weir consisted of a curtain of sheet steel which was driven into the sand to the clay bed. This stop weir protruded approximately 1.2 metres (3 ft 11 in) above the sand level, with a concrete overflow section and also prevented water, released from the upstream Gleeson's Weir, which had previously percolated downstream, from doing so.

In October 1943 the construction of a permanent concrete weir at this location began. This was completed and began use in January 1944 and became known as Aplin's Weir. The weir consisted of a hollow buttress weir with sloped walls on both sides of the weir and concrete abutments. repairs occurred several times during the 1950s after flood damage. The downstream slope of Aplin's Weir has in recent years deteriorated and much of the concrete slope has collapsed exposing the buttresses. The weir received a significant upgrade in 2011(??).

In the late 1990s a bridge connecting the suburbs of Mundingburra and Annandale was built, using the footings of Aplin's Weir for support. In February 2019 the bridge was swept away in floods waters. This was caused by too much water coming out of the Ross River Dam due to 1 in a 100-year rain.

The area of water stored between Gleeson's Weir and Aplin's Weir is primarily used for recreational activities with the Townsville & JCU Rowing Club, a dragon boat club, kayakers and stand up paddle-boarders all using the river. This section of the river is used for local rowing regattas, especially the 1000m racing course above the Barton bridge.

Every year the Townsville Open Water Association holds the Liz Birch memorial King and Queen of the river swim. This is a 2.7 kilometres (1.7 mi) swim that starts at Aplins weir and proceeds to the Barton bridge and back to Rossiter park pontoon. The oldest person to undertake this swim is 79-year-old Thelma Burke. Aquatic weed issues in the river in recent years seem to have prevented this event from occurring as regularly as in the past (at least in this location).

== Ross River fever ==
Ross River fever is a serious, though generally not life-threatening, tropical disease caused by infection by the Ross River virus, a mosquito-borne alphavirus. In 1959, an Aedes vigilax mosquito sampled from the banks of the Ross River was used to isolate the virus. The virus and fever were named after Ross River. However, Ross River fever is not isolated to the Ross River and surrounding areas. There have been major outbreaks of the disease in all Australian states through mosquito-borne infection with Ross River virus.

== Ecology ==
The Ross River has two distinctly different ecosystems. Above the Aplin's Weir is a freshwater environment, and below the weir there is a tidal brackish/saltwater environment.

Freshwater crocodiles can be found above Aplin's Weir, whilst Saltwater crocodiles live in the tidal area downstream

== See also ==
- List of rivers of Australia § Queensland
