= Ross River Dam =

Dam in North Queensland, Australia

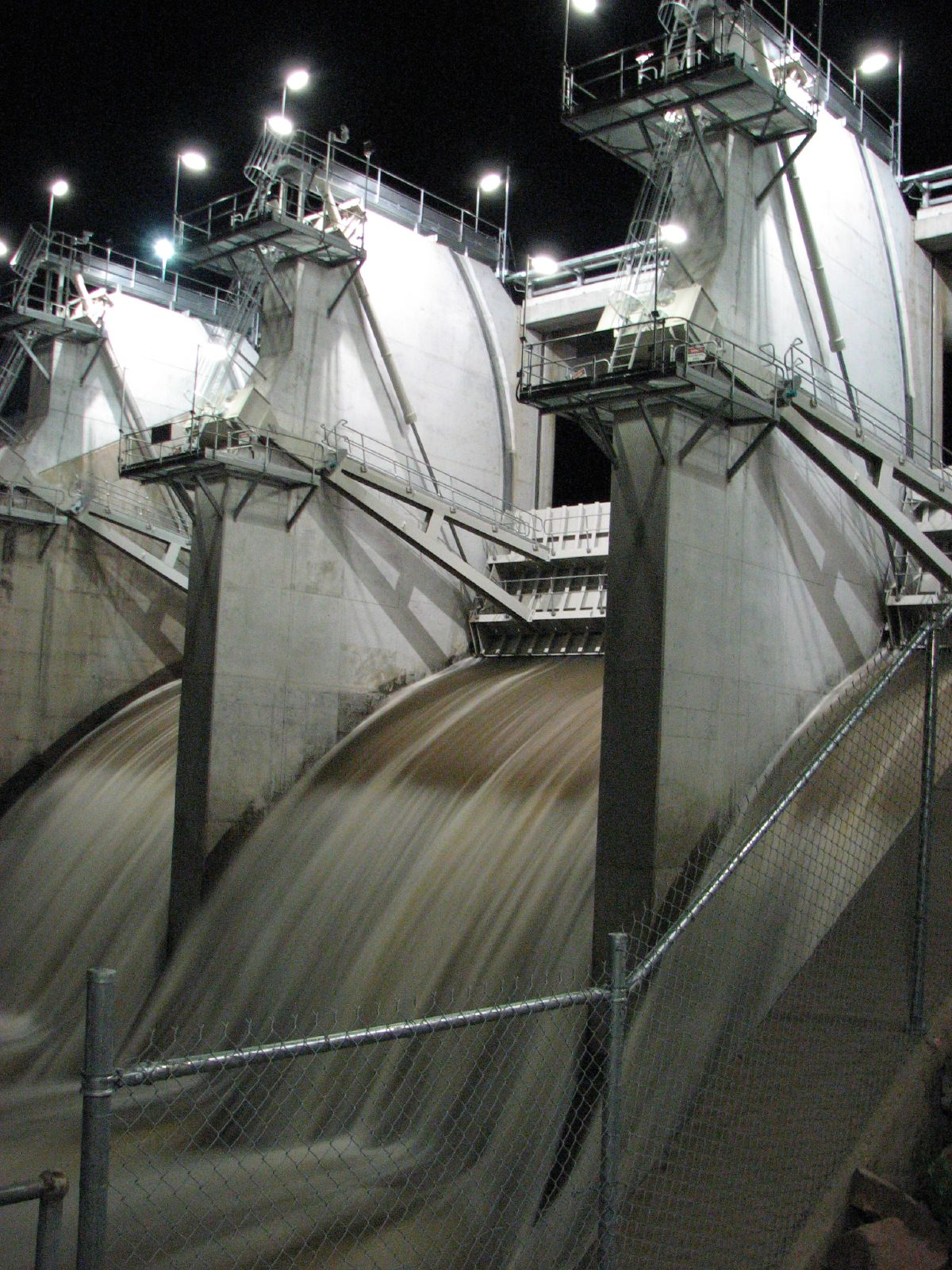
- The spillway at night in 2008, with open floodgates

- Location of the dam wall in Queensland
- Interactive map of Ross River Dam
- Country: Australia
- Location: Southwest of Townsville, North Queensland
- Coordinates: 19°24′38″S 146°44′07″E
- Purpose: Flood control; water supply
- Status: Operational
- Construction began: 1971
- Opening date: 1974 (stage I); 1986 (stage II); 2007 (extension)
- Built by: Leighton Contractors (1974); John Holland & Macmahon (2007)
- Owner: Townsville City Council
- Operator: Townsville Water

Dam and spillways
- Type of dam: Embankment dam
- Impounds: Ross River
- Height: 34.4 m (113 ft)
- Length: 8,670 m (28,440 ft)
- Elevation at crest: 48 m (157 ft) AHD
- Width (crest): 7.9 m (26 ft)
- Dam volume: 5,085×10^{3} m^{3} (179.6×10^{6} cu ft)
- Spillways: 3
- Spillway type: Controlled
- Spillway length: 36.6 m (120 ft)
- Spillway capacity: 674 m^{3}/s (23,800 cu ft/s)

Reservoir
- Creates: Lake Ross
- Total capacity: 1,200,000 ML (970,000 acre⋅ft)
- Active capacity: 233,187 ML (189,048 acre⋅ft)
- Catchment area: 750 km^{2} (290 sq mi)
- Surface area: 8,200 ha (20,000 acres)
- Normal elevation: 38.55 m (126.5 ft) AHD
- Website townsville.qld.gov.au

The Ross River Dam is an earth- and rock-filled embankment dam across the Ross River, located between Kelso and Mount Stuart in the City of Townsville in North Queensland, Australia. Built initially for flood control, Lake Ross, the impoundment created by the dam, serves as one of the major water supplies for the region, and provides approximately 85 percent of the city's potable water.

The reservoir reached 250% capacity in February 2019 as a result of mass rainfall and flooding in the area.

== Location and features ==
The dam was constructed by Leighton Contractors between 1971 and 1974 for the purposes of flood mitigation and water storage. The dam was an attempt to address Townsville's dual water concerns, abundance and scarcity. The initial capacity of the reservoir was 73,000 megalitres (59,000 acre⋅ft).

In the 1980s, the second stage of the dam necessitated a deviation of the Flinders Highway and Mount Isa railway line (which previously ran straight north-south) to be further east. This was completed by 1986 and resulted in the closure of Toonpan and Barringha railway stations on the removed route; they were not re-established on new route. The resultant capacity of the reservoir increased to 417,000 megalitres (338,000 acre⋅ft).

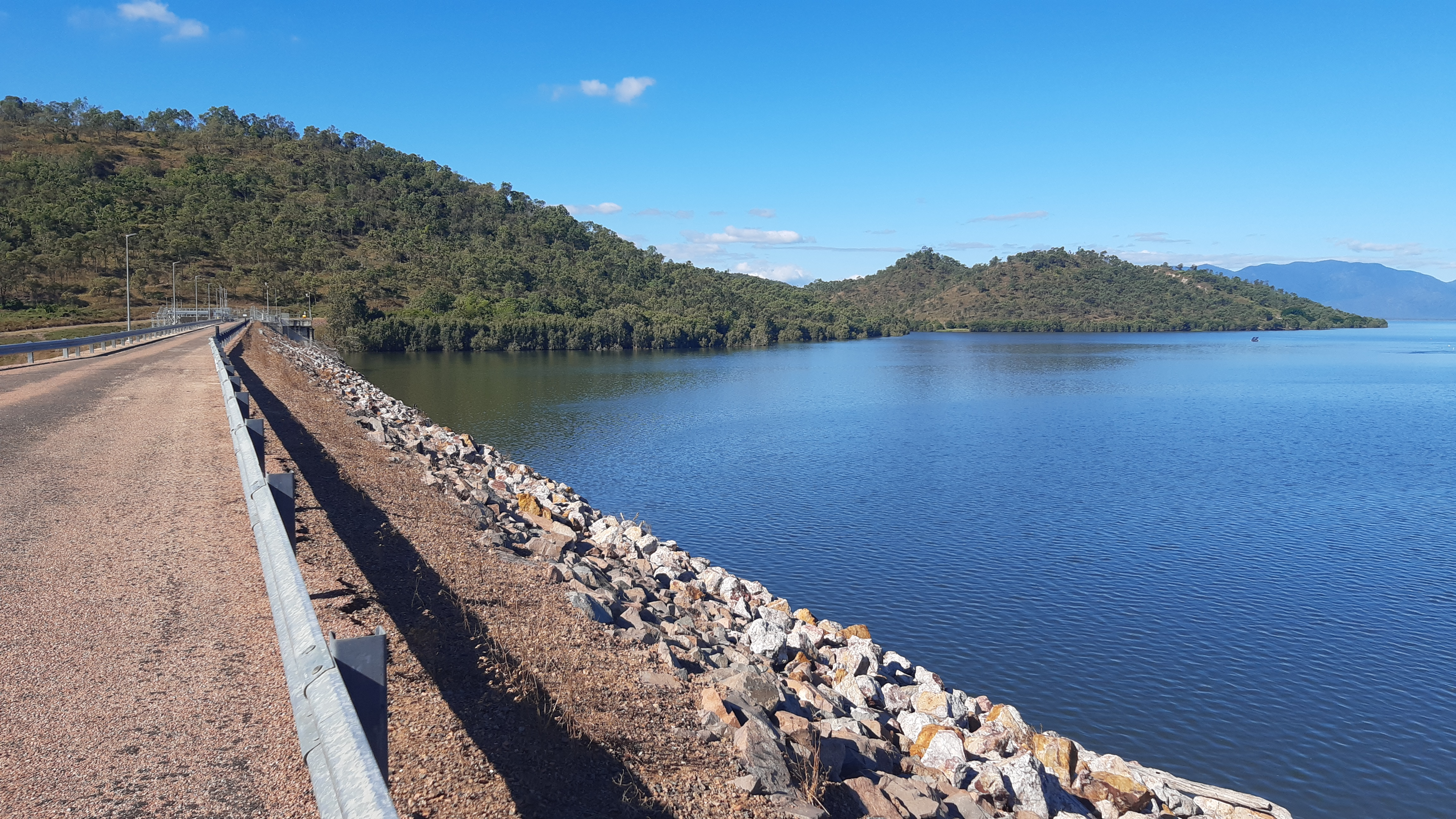
Part of the 8.67 km-long (28,400 ft) embankment and reservoir

Following a 2007 upgrade of facilities, the dam an earth and rock embankment that is 34.4 metres (113 ft) high and 8.67 kilometres (5.39 mi) long – that was, as of March 2026, the longest embankment dam in the southern hemisphere. The dam wall can hold back 1,200,000 megalitres (970,000 acre⋅ft), or 514 percent of full supply capacity. However, full supply, or active capacity, is 233,187 megalitres (189,048 acre⋅ft), that covers 8,200 hectares (20,000 acres), and draws from a catchment area of 750 square kilometres (290 sq mi). The controlled and gated spillway comprises three hydraulically-operated steel radial gates on concrete piers with a concrete service bridge, and can discharge 674 cubic metres per second (23,800 cu ft/s).

In 2019 there was major floods and the dam reached the highest capacity it ever has at 232.79% which caused the 2019 Townsville flood.

=== Upgrade of the dam wall ===
Since completion of stage I construction in 1974 and stage II extension in 1986, upgrades of the dam include:

- 1976 – the embankment was raised to 47.16 metres (154.7 ft)
- 1977 – a 1.2-metre-high (3.9 ft) steel radial gate was installed that increased storage capacity to 110,000 megalitres (89,000 acre⋅ft)
- 1987 – the radial gate was removed and the concrete spillway raised to 38.21 metres (125.4 ft), that increased storage capacity to 210,000 megalitres (170,000 acre⋅ft)
- 2001 – a panel of experts in dam safety and construction undertook an investigation of the dam. Over two years, the panel conducted studies of the dam's compliance with world standards.
- 2003 – The report confirmed that upgrades were required and by late 2003 because the dam moved 10 centimetres (3.9 in) a year. At that rate, the dam would have burst in a 10-year period, causing the whole suburb of Kelso to be inundated. The spillway was lowered by 3.55 metres (11.6 ft) to 34.66 metres (113.7 ft), that reduced storage capacity to 73,000 megalitres (59,000 acre⋅ft). The reduction had the impact of significantly reducing water supply available to the community and addressing the risk of flooding events damaging downstream settlements.
- 2004 – A combined GHD-MWH team was appointed to design the remaining work and manage the project; and the following year, John Holland and Macmahon were contracted.
- 2007 – Construction was completed with sand filters and supporting earthfill, extra rockwork to the dam embankment, and the contraction of the gates. The embankment was raised to 48 metres (157 ft), the three 5.3-metre-high (17 ft) radial gates were added to the spillway, and storage capacity increased to 233,000 megalitres (189,000 acre⋅ft)

The spillway gates increased the reservoir's capacity by approximately nine percent, which is about 21,000 megalitres (17,000 acre⋅ft) or four months extra supply of water. Three spillway gates span the 40-metre-wide (130 ft) spillway. The upgrade was planned for completion in mid-2008, subject to rainfall delays, however it was completed in late 2007, ahead of time, at a cost of approximately A$120 million.

== See also ==
- List of dams and reservoirs in Queensland
- 1998 Townsville flood
- 2019 Townsville flood
