= Transport in Townsville =

Transport in Townsville, Queensland provides details of the transport services that support the city of Townsville in Queensland. As a major coastal city these include road, rail, sea, air, and public transport.

== History ==
=== 1960s ===
The Tasmanian historian Henry Reynolds, who arrived into Townsville in 1965 to fulfil a position as a lecturer at the nascent James Cook University, noted the disparity between car ownership between Aboriginal people and white Australians at the time:

Because Townsville had little public transport, indigenous families often spent half a day walking across the suburbs to meet friends or relatives. I had been in Townsville for several years before I saw an indigenous person driving a car. I can still remember my surprise. I told Margaret about it as soon as I got home and we wondered who the man was. Within a few years many families had become car owners.

== Road ==
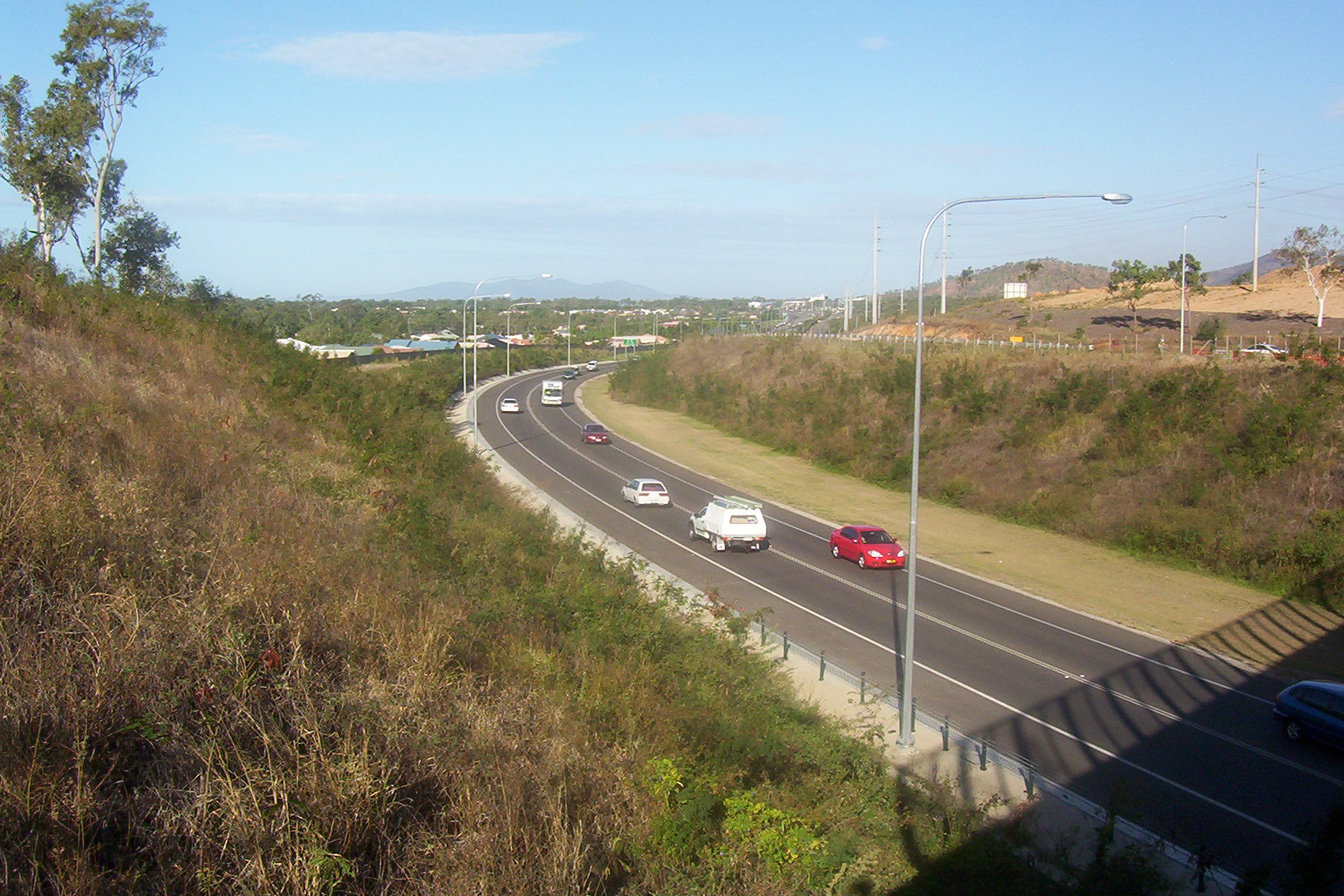
Douglas Arterial Road

The Bruce Highway (A1) bypasses the city and runs through the western suburbs, and the Flinders Highway (A6), the main highway to western localities such as Mount Isa and the Northern Territory, meets the Bruce Highway just south of Townsville. The Bruce Highway links Townsville to all of the State's major cities along the eastern seaboard, including Cairns, Proserpine, Mackay, Rockhampton, Bundaberg and Brisbane, the state capital.

Townsville has an orbital motorway, and is called the Townsville Ring Road and is the new Bruce Highway link that bypasses Townsville city and link the Bruce Highway south of Townsville to the Bruce Highway in the north-west urban area. The first stage of the motorway, Douglas Arterial Road opened in 2005. The second stage opened in 2009.

=== Lesser roads ===
In addition to the city's highways and motorway, it is serviced by a system of state and local government routes, mainly suburban and arterial roads which span to all parts of the metropolitan area. These roads ensure continuity of access in times of flooding or other natural disasters, and during planned maintenance activities.

== Rail ==
=== Passenger Services ===
The North Coast railway line operated by Queensland Rail passes through the city, and the Western line meets it in the city's south. Rail services from Brisbane pass through Townsville and continue through to Cairns. Townsville also has a regular Spirit of Queensland service to and from Brisbane and Cairns. The Spirit of Queensland service replaced the Tilt Train in October 2013. In 2019 the idea of running passenger services on existing lines within Townsville was raised, due to the spread out nature of the city this is a viable option as lines pass suburbs currently poorly served by public transport. The Queensland State Government ruled that out at present due to funding issues.

=== Freight Services ===
Townsville is a major destination and generator of rail freight services. Container operations are run by both Aurizon in South Townsville and Pacific National at Stuart. The local nickel and copper refineries as well as minerals from the western line (Mount Isa) are transported to the port for trans-shipment to other destinations.

== Public transport ==
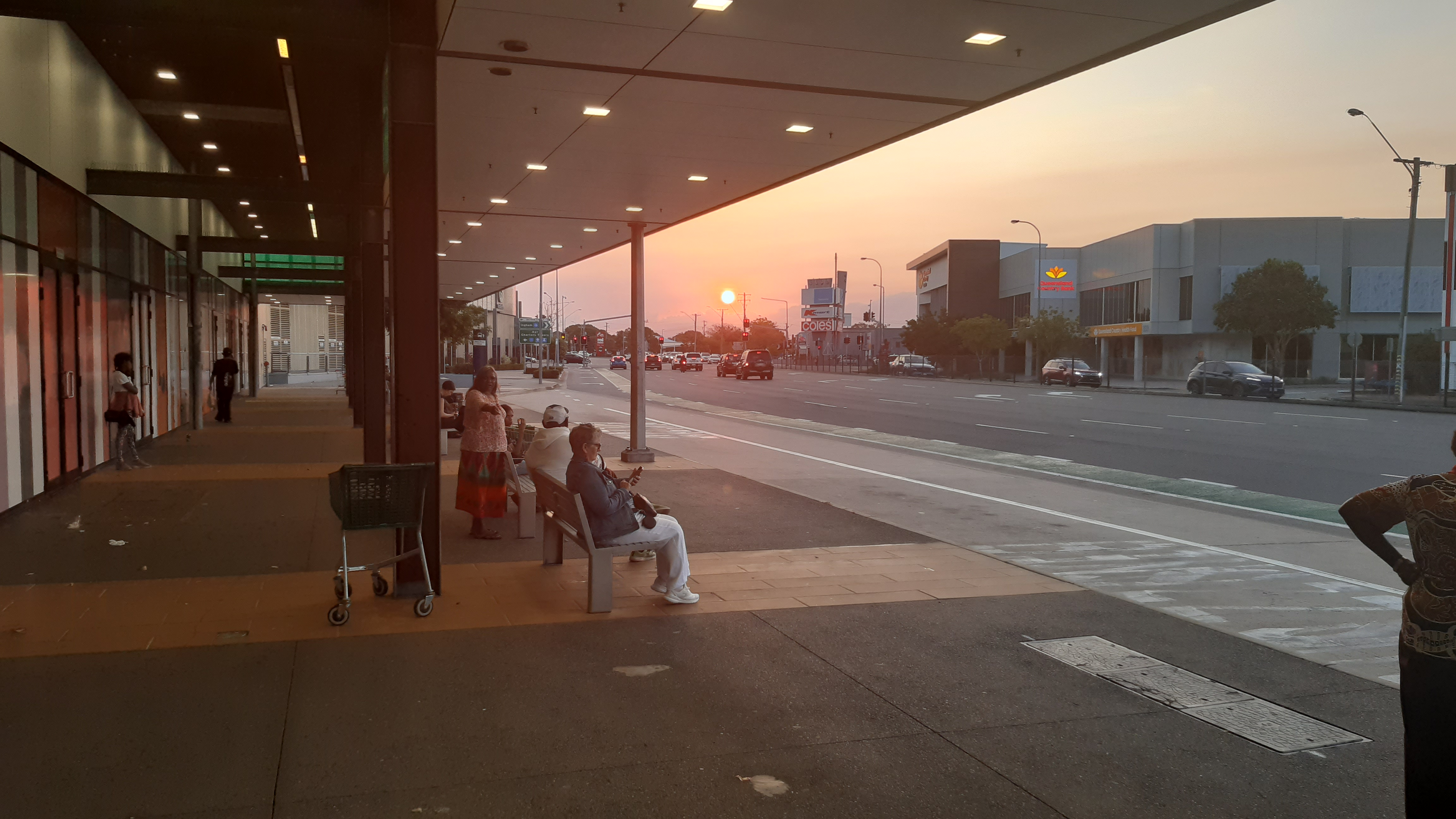
Passengers wait for buses at the Townsville Shopping Centre bus stop, Aitkenvale at dusk

Townsville's public transport system consists of bus services operated by Kinetic Townsville. Kinetic provides regular services to and from many parts of the city, and also operates several express routes. For example, routes 1, 1A, 1B, 1C and 1X link the CBD to the Townsville Hospital via Townsville Shopping Centre and to the suburb of Kelso. A public transport route is also available from the CBD to Bushland Beach, a route run by Townsville's Hermit Park Bus Service, also Townsville's biggest Charter Bus Service.

In addition to the bus system, Taxis operate 24 hours a day and service all parts of the metropolitan area.

== Sea ==
Townsville has a significant port at the mouth of Ross Creek. The Port of Townsville mainly handles cargoes of cement and nickel ore, for processing at the Yabulu Nickel Refinery, 30 kilometres (19 mi) north of the port. The port also serves as an export point for sugar and for products from north Queensland's mines. The port has three sugar storage sheds, with the newest being the largest under-cover storage area in Australia.

Regular ferry services operate to Magnetic Island and Palm Island. The service to Magnetic Island is operated by Sunferries.

== Air ==
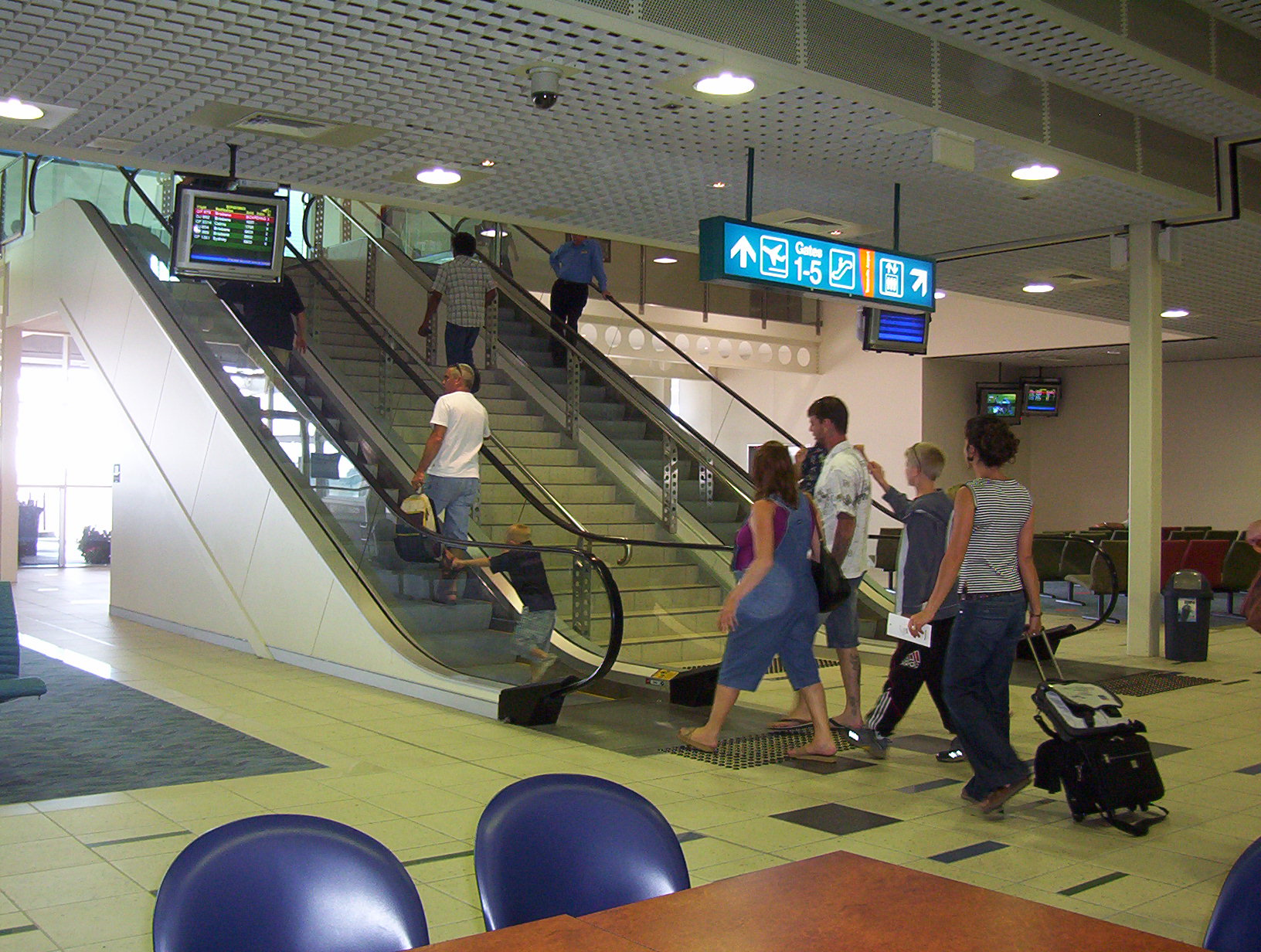
Inside the Departure Lounge of Townsville Airport

Townsville Airport at Garbutt was greatly expanded by the United States Armed Forces during World War II. These expansions made Townsville's airfield the largest in the southern hemisphere for some time. The airport has since been rebuilt several times. Townsville Airport serves as a hub for Queensland regional airline Alliance Airlines, which operates charter services to major mines located in outback Queensland. The airport land is also shared with RAAF Base Townsville. The airport was upgraded in 2003 to include new terminal departure and arrivals areas, and three new aerobridges. Townsville Airport has direct flights to Melbourne, Sydney and Brisbane as well as direct connections to many regional centres in Queensland including Cairns, Mackay, Hamilton Island and Mount Isa. International flights resumed on 3 December 2010 with Air Australia services to Bali (Denpasar) twice weekly. In 2015, Jetstar began regular international flights from Townsville to Denpasar, Bali.

The airport is served by all three major Australian domestic carriers - Qantas, Jetstar, and Virgin Australia - as well as regional carriers QantasLink, Rex Airlines, Alliance Airlines and Skytrans Airlines.

== See also ==
- Townsville
- Townsville Airport
- Port of Townsville
- Townsville Ring Road
