= Pinnacles Gallery =

Coordinates: 19.319805°S 146.730566°E

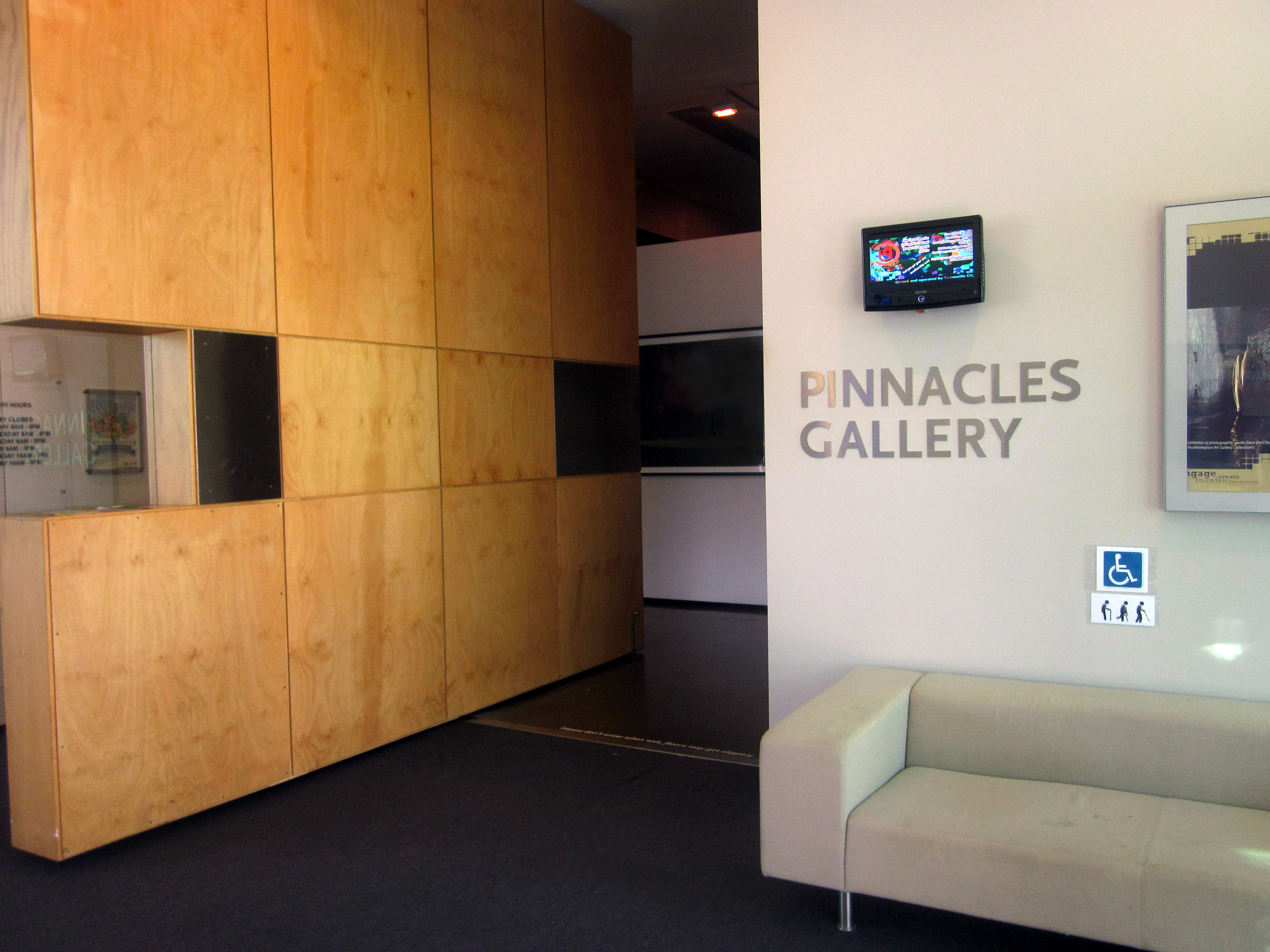
- Entrance to Pinnacles Gallery
- Established: 1996
- Location: Riverway Arts Centre, 20 Village Boulevard, Townsville, Australia
- Type: Art space / Gallery
- Owner: City of Townsville
- Public transit access: Willows Shopping Centre bus stop
- Parking: Riverway parking lot
- Website: townsville.qld.gov.au/facilities/galleries/pinnacles

Pinnacles Gallery is an art space located within the Riverway Arts Centre at Riverway, Townsville, Queensland, Australia. Its mission is "to make sure its programs are contemporary, engaging, accessible, interactive and enjoyable".

Artists can submit applications to have solo exhibitions of their work exhibited, and the gallery co-ordinates a number of group exhibitions in which artists can submit works. Pinnacles also hosts artist talks and workshops for a range of ages, as well as educational programs and guided tours for school and community groups. The gallery exhibits contemporary work from local, national and international artists.

Pinnacles also operates exhibitions at Your Space, an exhibition space for artists, community groups and curators in the foyer of the Thuringowa branch of CityLibraries Townsville. Exhibitions are generally shown for a duration of four weeks, and showcase works of a local social, literary and historical significance. Selections are made with the view to maintain a diverse, high quality community exhibition program.

== History ==
Pinnacles Gallery was originally located alongside the Thuringowa Library, now the Thuringowa branch of CityLibraries Townsville. The gallery was opened alongside the opening of the refurbished library on 17 March 1996 by the Thuringowa City mayor Les Tyrell. Diane Vance, the community services director for Thuringowa City Council at the time stated that the gallery "will be for a variety of things – travelling exhibitions and local art. We see it as a wide-ranging gallery for the people – not an elitist place". In the first 12 months of running Pinnacles had over 35,000 visitors to 19 exhibitions, in which 65% of the exhibitions were by local artists or community groups.

In 2006 the gallery moved to its current location within the Riverway Arts Centre—the only purpose-built gallery building in Townsville. Pinnacles' move opened up many possibilities, as the new space has a strong range of multimedia capabilities.

As part of the 2007–8 amalgamation of the City of Thuringowa and the then-City of Townsville, the gallery was considered for closure but it was kept open after community lobbying.

Former Gallery Coordinators include Inge Kaye and Jacqueline Murphy. After the amalgamation, Amber Church headed the new team. The current Operations Supervisor, head of the gallery team, is Anthony Edwards.

== Annual exhibitions ==
=== Creative Generations Excellence Awards in Visual art and Design ===
The Creative Generations Excellence Awards in Visual Art and Design is an exhibition of works from the North Queensland Education District hosted annually by Pinnacles. The artworks are from senior school students studying an OP registered art course, and the exhibition includes workshops and a school holiday program.

==== ArtNow ====
ArtNow was specifically created to run alongside Creative Generations to offer an opportunity for those students not studying an OP registered art course to still exhibit their works at this time. The exhibition is open annually to senior students studying any art-related subject.

== Recent/Future Exhibitions ==
Impossible Universe: Now Here - 9 June until 15 July 2012

- An IDAprojects and Platform China Touring Exhibition featuring six artists from a new, young generation of video artists in China.

== Past exhibitions ==
=== 2012 ===
Machinima - 4 February – 1 April 2012

- Filmmaking, animation and game development in real-time 3D virtual video game environments including Second Life, Halo and The Sims.

Imagined Worlds - 14 April – 3 June 2012

- A photographic exhibition featuring large-scale works by Dennis Del Favero, Marian Drew, Richard Dunlop and Shane Fitzgerald.

=== 2011 ===
Ron Mueck - 19 November 2011 to 8 January 2012

- Touring Exhibition of Ron Mueck's In Bed (2005)

== Townsville Artist Markets ==
The Townsville Artist Markets are hosted by Pinnacles Gallery and is currently held at Riverway every 2–3 months, and are planned to run from 1pm until 5pm on a Saturday. The markets contain stalls from artists and crafts people of the region, as well as entertainment from workshops, local musicians and La Luna Arts performances.

The markets were first held in the foyer of the Riverway Arts Centre on Saturday 5 May 2012 after a cancellation the previous weekend due to weather.

The upcoming announced dates for the markets are:

- Saturday 9 June 2012
- Saturday 1 September 2012
- Saturday 13 October 2012
- Saturday 15 December 2012
