= Gumlow, Queensland =

Gumlow
- Suburb
- Interactive map of Gumlow
- Coordinates: 19.3572°S 146.6797°E
- Country: Australia
- State: Queensland
- LGA: City of Townsville
- Location: 9.4 km (5.8 mi) SSW of Thuringowa Central; 21.2 km (13.2 mi) SW of Townsville; 1,373 km (853 mi) NNW of Brisbane

Government
  - State electorate: Thuringowa
  - Federal division: Kennedy

Area
  - Total: 34.5 km^{2} (13.3 sq mi)

Population
  - Total: 142 (2021 census)
  - Density: 4.116/km^{2} (10.66/sq mi)
- Time zone: UTC+10:00 (AEST)
- Postcode: 4815
Suburbs around Gumlow
Alice River	Bohle Plains	Condon
Alice River	Gumlow	Rasmussen
Pinnacles	Pinnacles	Kelso

Gumlow is a peri-urban locality in the City of Townsville, Queensland, Australia. In the 2021 census, Gumlow had a population of 142 people.

== Geography ==
The Bohle River forms most of the eastern boundary, and the Little Bohle River most of the northern.

The western part of the locality is rural in character with the land use being entirely grazing on native vegetation. The eastern part of the locality is adjacent to Townsville's south-western suburban sprawl and the land use is a mixture of rural residential housing, intensive animal husbandry, and irrigated horticulture.

== History ==
Condon Water Purification Plant was constructed in present-day Gumlow in 1986.

The locality was officially named and bounded on 27 July 1991.

== Demographics ==
In the 2016 census, Gumlow had a population of 167 people.

In the 2021 census, Gumlow had a population of 142 people.

== Economy ==
The locality has a barramundi fish farm and also poultry-raising facilities.

There are also two turf farms.

== Education ==
There are no schools in Gumlow. The nearest government schools are Rasmussen State School in neighbouring Rasmussen to the east and The Willows State School in Kirwan to the north-east. The nearest government secondary school is Thuringowa State High School in neighbouring Condon to the north-east.

== Facilities ==
Despite the name, the Condon Wastewater Treatment Plant is at 45 Bohle Road in Gumlow (19.3376°S 146.7049°E). The facility is continuously operating and processes approx 4 megalitres (140×10^{3} cu ft) of wastewater each day with a capacity of 5 megalitres (180×10^{3} cu ft) per day. It services a population of about 22,000. The treated wastewater is mostly used for irrigation of the Townsville Golf Course or discharged into the adjacent Bohle River. Biosolids are collected and used for fertiliser.

== Attractions ==
Barra Fun Park offers water park activities and barramundi fishing at 505 Allambie Lane (19.3640°S 146.7022°E).
