= Mandurah Bridge =

Mandurah Bridge may refer to:

- Mandurah Estuary Bridge
- Mandurah Traffic Bridge
