= Georgiou Group =

Australian construction company

- Formerly: Direct Drainage
- Company type: Subsidiary
- Industry: Construction
- Founded: 1977
- Founder: Spiro Georgiou
- Headquarters: Osborne Park, Western Australia
- Area served: Australia
- Key people: John Georgiou (Executive Chairman); Gary Georgiou (CEO)
- Revenue: $1.04 billion (2023)
- Net income: $45 million (2023)
- Number of employees: More than 900
- Parent: Strabag
- Website: www.georgiou.com.au

'Georgiou Group is an Australian building construction and civil engineering company with headquarters in Perth. It is a subsidiary of Strabag.

== History ==
Georgiou was founded by Spiro Georgiou in 1977 as Direct Drainage in North Perth, Western Australia. Geocrete was founded to manufacture concrete pipes, stormwater drains and tanks, while RoadPave Australia was established as a road surface contractor. In 1996 all three merged to form the Georgiou Group.

Offices opened in Brisbane (2008), Melbourne (2009), Sydney (2015) the Gold Coast (2023) and in Darwin (2023). In March 2025, Georgiou was purchased by Strabag.

== Notable projects ==
=== Western Australia ===
- Perth Arena early works (2006)
- Aubin Grove railway station (2017)
- Mandurah Traffic Bridge (2017)
- Mooro-Beeloo Bridge (2023)
- Ocean Reef Marina Development (ongoing)
- Mandurah Estuary Bridge (ongoing)
- Midland railway station redevelopment in alliance with McConnell Dowell (ongoing)
- Alkimos Seawater Desalination Plant (ongoing)

=== Queensland ===
- Isle of Capri bridge (2022)
- Townsville Ring Road Stage 5 project in joint venture with Aecom (2023)
- Coomera Connector Stage 1 North in joint venture with Acciona (ongoing)
- Centenary Bridge upgrade in joint venture with BMD (ongoing)
- Breakfast Creek Green Bridge (2024)
- Hope Island railway station (ongoing)

=== New South Wales ===
- Windsor Bridge (2021)
- Mona Vale Road East Upgrade (2024)
- M12 Motorway, joint venture with CPB Contractors (ongoing)
- Newell Highway: Parkes bypass (ongoing)
