= Douglas, Queensland =

Douglas
- Suburb
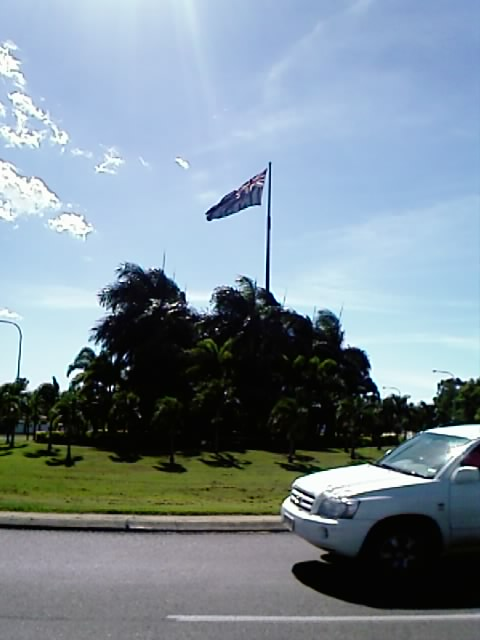
- Flag at roundabout on the Bruce Highway at the entrance to Douglas

- Interactive map of Douglas
- Coordinates: 19.3244°S 146.7469°E
- Country: Australia
- State: Queensland
- City: Townsville
- LGA: City of Townsville
- Location: 11.2 km (7.0 mi) SW of Townsville CBD; 1,357 km (843 mi) NNW of Brisbane

Government
  - State electorate: Mundingburra
  - Federal division: Herbert

Area
  - Total: 8.8 km^{2} (3.4 sq mi)

Population
  - Total: 7,780 (2021 census)
  - Density: 884/km^{2} (2,290/sq mi)
- Time zone: UTC+10:00 (AEST)
- Postcode: 4814
Suburbs around Douglas
Kirwan	Cranbrook	Aitkenvale; Annandale
Thuringowa Central	Douglas	Murray
Condon	Mount Stuart	Mount Stuart

Douglas is a suburb of Townsville in the City of Townsville, Queensland, Australia. In the 2021 census, Douglas had a population of 7,780 people.

== Geography ==
Douglas is bounded to the north by the Ross River and is 11.2 kilometres (7.0 mi) to the south-west of the Townsville CBD.

Though mainly residential, it does contain James Cook University and the Townsville University Hospital. The suburb is also known due to the Douglas Arterial Road which is a dual-carriageway motorway through the suburb, and was the first stage of the Townsville Ring Road (now the Bruce Highway). Douglas–Garbutt Road (University Road) runs along the north-eastern boundary.

== History ==
The suburb was named by the Queensland Place Names Board on 1 July 1968 after Robert Johnstone Douglas, a judge of the Supreme Court of Queensland from 1923 to 1953.

The suburb is in the middle of a residential boom, with student accommodation expansion projects at James Cook University and also the establishment of two Housing estates in close proximity.

Enkindle Village School opened at the James Cook University campus on 19 February 2019 with 17 students from Prep to Year 3.

== Demographics ==
In the 2016 census, Douglas had a population of 7,744 people. Aboriginal and Torres Strait Islander people made up 2.7% of the population. 71.4% of people were born in Australia. The next most common countries of birth were India 4.3%, England 2.3% and New Zealand 1.7%. 76.9% of people spoke only English at home. Other languages spoken at home included Malayalam at 3.2%. The most common responses for religion were No Religion 38.3%, Catholic 19.2% and Anglican 10.4%.

In the 2021 census, Douglas had a population of 7,780 people.

== Education ==
Endkindle Village School is a private primary (Prep–6) school for boys and girls at 1 James Cook Drive within James Cook University. It will be accepting all primary year students by 2022.

Tec-NQ is a private secondary (11–12) school for boys and girls at 54 Discovery Drive (19.3221°S 146.7642°E). In 2017, the school had an enrolment of 267 students with 21 teachers and 27 non-teaching staff (23 full-time equivalent).

There are no government schools in Douglas. The nearest government primary school is in neighbouring Annandale, while the nearest government secondary schools are Thuringowa State High School in Condon and Heatley Secondary College in Heatley.
