= Cranbrook, Queensland =

Cranbrook
- Suburb
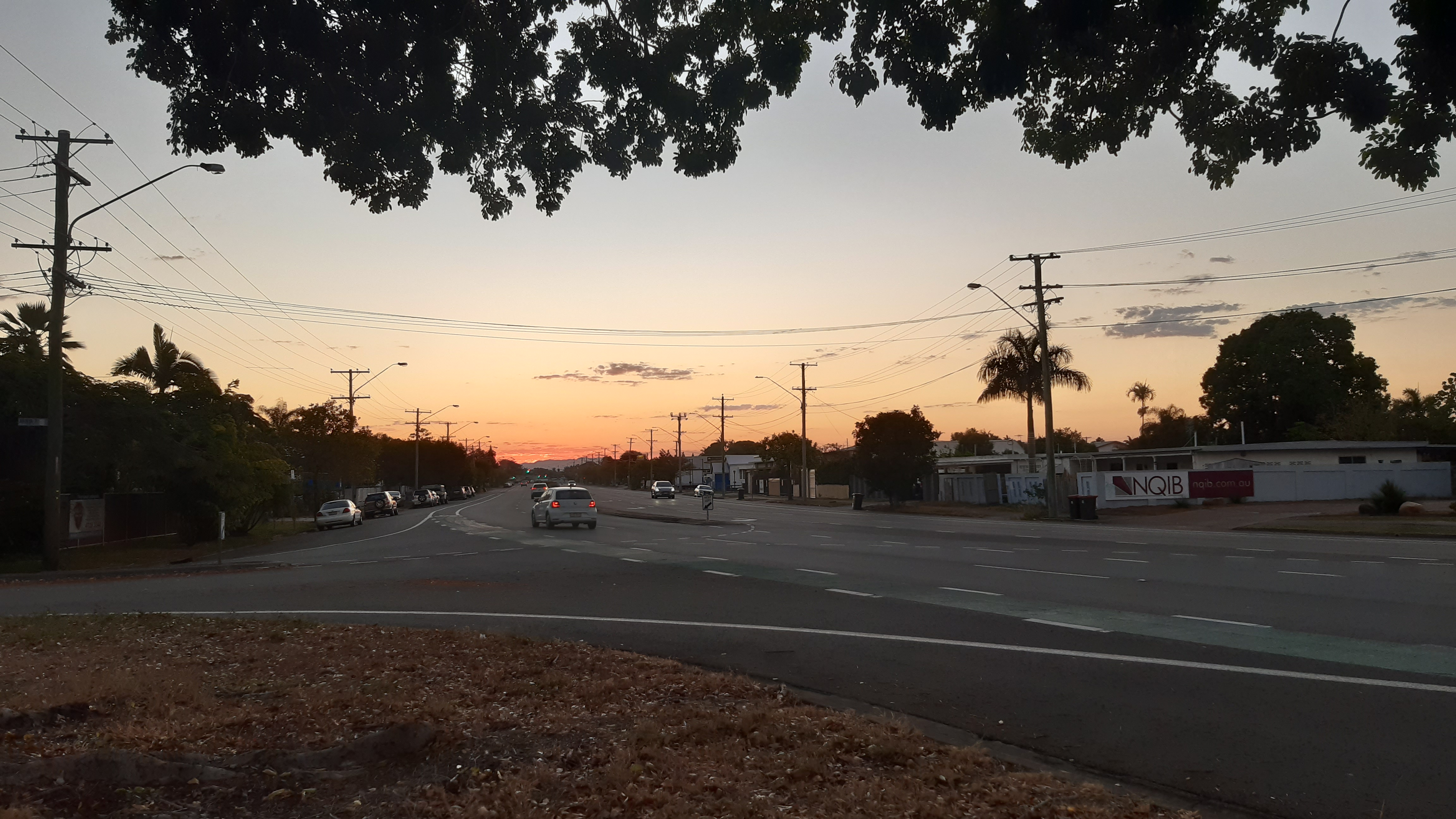
- Sunset over Hervey Range as seen from Cranbrook

- Interactive map of Cranbrook
- Coordinates: 19.3066°S 146.75°E
- Country: Australia
- State: Queensland
- City: Townsville
- LGA: City of Townsville
- Location: 2.2 km (1.4 mi) S of Heatley; 3.9 km (2.4 mi) E of Kirwan; 10.3 km (6.4 mi) SW of Townsville CBD; 1,358 km (844 mi) NNW of Brisbane

Government
  - State electorate: Mundingburra
  - Federal division: Herbert

Area
  - Total: 3.4 km^{2} (1.3 sq mi)

Population
  - Total: 5,844 (2021 census)
  - Density: 1,719/km^{2} (4,450/sq mi)
- Time zone: UTC+10:00 (AEST)
- Postcode: 4814
Suburbs around Cranbrook
Heatley	Heatley	Vincent
Kirwan	Cranbrook	Aitkenvale
Douglas	Douglas	Annandale

Cranbrook is a south-western suburb of Townsville in the City of Townsville, Queensland, Australia. In the 2021 census, Cranbrook had a population of 5,844 people.

== Geography ==
Cranbrook is located 8 kilometres (5.0 mi) south-west of the Townsville CBD. It is close to the Aitkenvale business district. Ross River Road runs through from north-east to southwest, and Douglas–Garbutt Road (Nathan Street) runs along the eastern boundary.

The land use is predominantly suburban housing with associated services including schools, shops, and parkland.

== History ==
On 1 July 1968, Cranbrook was named by Queensland Place Names Board after Cranbrook, the Sydney home of Robert Towns.

Holy Spirit School opened on 15 May 1969.

Ignatius Park College opened on 25 August 1969.

Cranbrook State School opened on 27 January 1981.

== Demographics ==
In the 2016 census, Cranbrook had a population of 5,908 people.

In the 2021 census, Cranbrook had a population of 5,844 people.

== Education ==
Cranbrook State School is a government primary (Prep–6) school for boys and girls at Alice Street (19.3092°S 146.7538°E). In 2017, the school had an enrolment of 535 students with 44 teachers (39 full-time equivalent) and 25 non-teaching staff (18 full-time equivalent). It includes a special education program.

Holy Spirit Catholic School is a Catholic primary (Prep–6) school for boys and girls at Hatchett Street (19.3021°S 146.7556°E). In 2017, the school had an enrolment of 751 students with 42 teachers (39 full-time equivalent) and 34 non-teaching staff (23 full-time equivalent).

Ignatius Park College is a Catholic secondary (7–12) school for boys at 368–384 Ross River Road (19.2995°S 146.7572°E). In 2017, the school had an enrolment of 1104 students with 93 teachers (90 full-time equivalent) and 52 non-teaching staff (44 full-time equivalent).

There are no government secondary schools in Cranbook. The nearest government secondary schools are Kirwan State High School in neighbouring Kirwan to the west and Heatley Secondary College in neighbouring Heatley to the north.
