= Rasmussen, Queensland =

Rasmussen
- Suburb
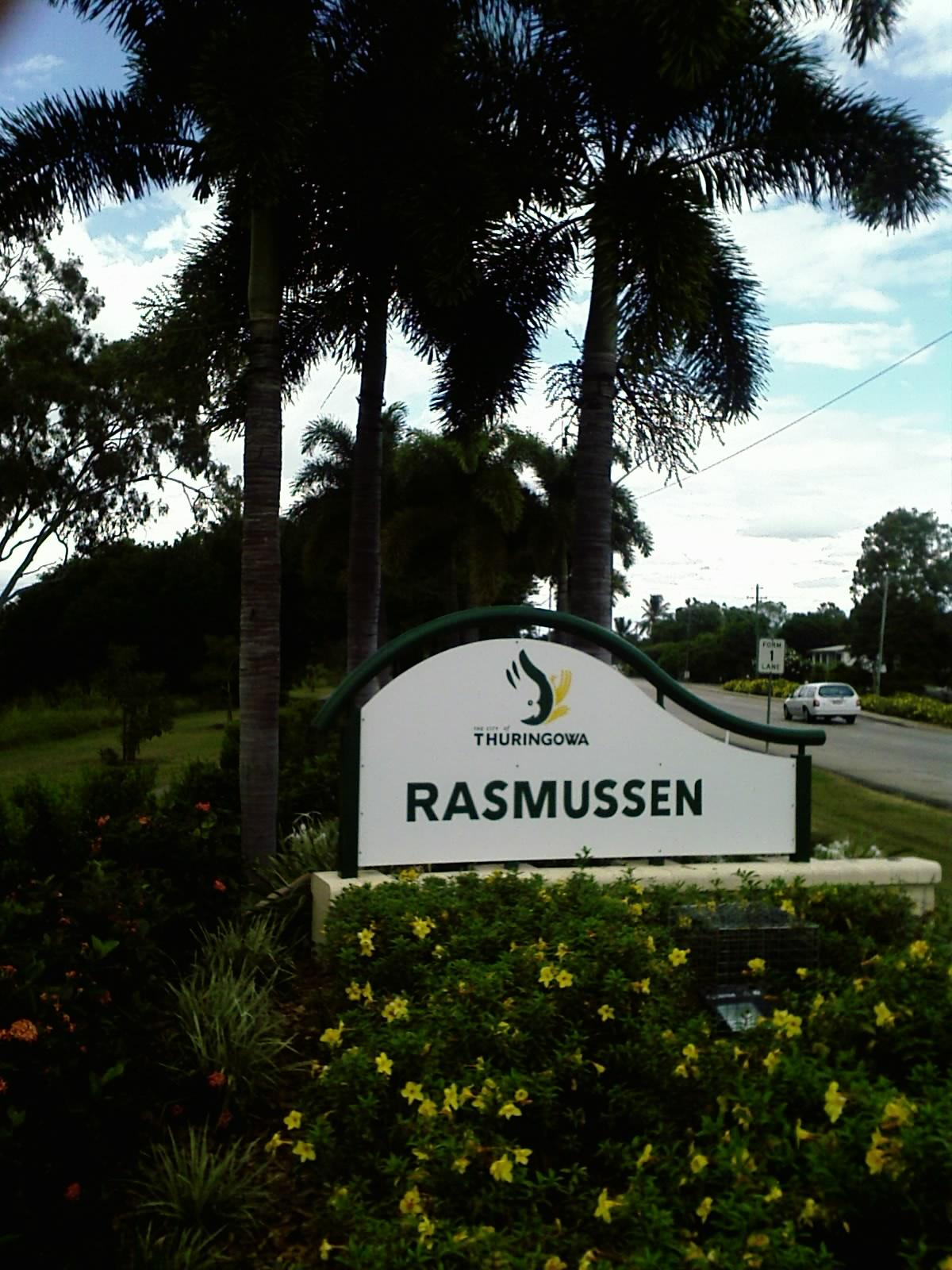

- Interactive map of Rasmussen
- Coordinates: 19.3536°S 146.7208°E
- Country: Australia
- State: Queensland
- City: Townsville
- LGA: City of Townsville
- Location: 16.7 km (10.4 mi) SW of Townsville CBD; 1,339 km (832 mi) NNW of Brisbane

Government
  - State electorate: Thuringowa
  - Federal division: Herbert

Area
  - Total: 5.5 km^{2} (2.1 sq mi)

Population
  - Total: 4,669 (2021 census)
  - Density: 849/km^{2} (2,199/sq mi)
- Time zone: UTC+10:00 (AEST)
- Postcode: 4815
Suburbs around Rasmussen
Gumlow	Condon	Mount Stuart
Gumlow	Rasmussen	Mount Stuart
Gumlow	Kelso	Mount Stuart

Rasmussen is a suburb of Townsville in the City of Townsville LGA, Queensland, Australia. In the 2021 census, Rasmussen had a population of 4,669 people.

== Geography ==
Rasmussen is the second suburb on Garbutt–Upper Ross Road (Riverway Drive) and is between the suburbs of Condon and Kelso. The area is flat and is bounded on the east by the Ross River.

== History ==
Like all the suburbs in the Upper Ross and Riverway area, it is named after early settlers. Rasmussen is named after the Danish Rasmussen family (Jorgen Rasmussen), who had a dairy farm on the Ross River.

Rasmussen State School opened on 23 January 1978.

Good Shepherd Catholic School opened in January 1996 on a 10-acre (4.0 ha) site purchased in 1993. It initially offered Years Prep to 3 with an initial enrolment of 81 students.

In 2018, two developers have announced plans for major shopping centres.

== Demographics ==
In the 2016 census, Rasmussen had a population of 4,456 people.

In the 2021 census, Rasmussen had a population of 4,669 people.

== Education ==
Rasmussen State School is a government primary (Early Childhood to Year 6) school for boys and girls at Allambie Lane (19.3649°S 146.7292°E). In 2018, the school had an enrolment of 468 students with 39 teachers (37 full-time equivalent) and 28 non-teaching staff (19 full-time equivalent). It includes a special education program.

Good Shepherd Catholic School is a Catholic primary (Prep–6) school for boys and girls at 65 Allambie Lane (19.3643°S 146.7244°E). In 2018, the school had an enrolment of 309 students with 22 teachers (20 full-time equivalent) and 23 non-teaching staff (14 full-time equivalent).

There are no secondary schools in Rasmussen. The nearest government secondary school is Thuringowa State High School in neighbouring Condon to the north.

== Facilities ==
Upper Ross Police Facility is at 12 Bluewattle Boulevard (19.3583°S 146.7306°E).

Riverway Plaza is a shopping centre at 1219 Riverway Drive (19.3631°S 146.7310°E). It is anchored by a Woolworths supermarket. Rasmussen Post Office is in this centre (19.3625°S 146.7314°E).

== Amenities ==
Good Shepherd Community Centre is part of the Good Shepherd Catholic School complex on Alambie Lane (19.3642°S 146.7233°E). It is used as a place of worship by a number of denominations, including the Catholic Church and the Anglican Church.

Upper Ross Community Centre is at 43 Alambie Lane (19.3645°S 146.7271°E). It provides a range of social services to the public. The Police & Citizen Youth Club (PCYC) also operates from this site, providing sports facilities.

There is a bushland reserve that runs the length of the suburb between Rivewray Drive and the Ross River, known as Loam Island. There are a number of outdoor recreational facilities there including walking trails, rowing club, boy scouts, and a boat ramp opposite Illuta Street off Riverway Drive into the Ross River (19.3491°S 146.7313°E). It is managed by the Townsville City Council.

There are a number of parks in the area:

- Allambie Lane Park (19.3643°S 146.7271°E)
- Beck Drive Park (19.3454°S 146.7166°E)
- Glenrock Park (19.3435°S 146.7211°E)
- Illuta Street Park (19.3509°S 146.7292°E)
- Neil Mccarthy Park (19.3510°S 146.7229°E)
- Renecol Park (19.3405°S 146.7181°E)
- Teressa Street Park (19.3617°S 146.7293°E)
