= Sunferries =

- Sunferries logo
- Founded: 1997
- Headquarters: Townsville, Australia
- Area served: Coral Sea
- Services: Passenger transportation Charters

Sunferries was a ferry company based in Townsville, Queensland.

It operated both ferry services to Magnetic Island and Palm Island, as well as charter and tour vessel services to the Great Barrier Reef.

In March 2011 it was acquired by the SeaLink Travel Group and was rebranded Sealink.

== See also ==
- Transport in Townsville, Queensland
