= Townsville Ring Road =

Road in Queensland, Australia

Townsville Ring Road Queensland
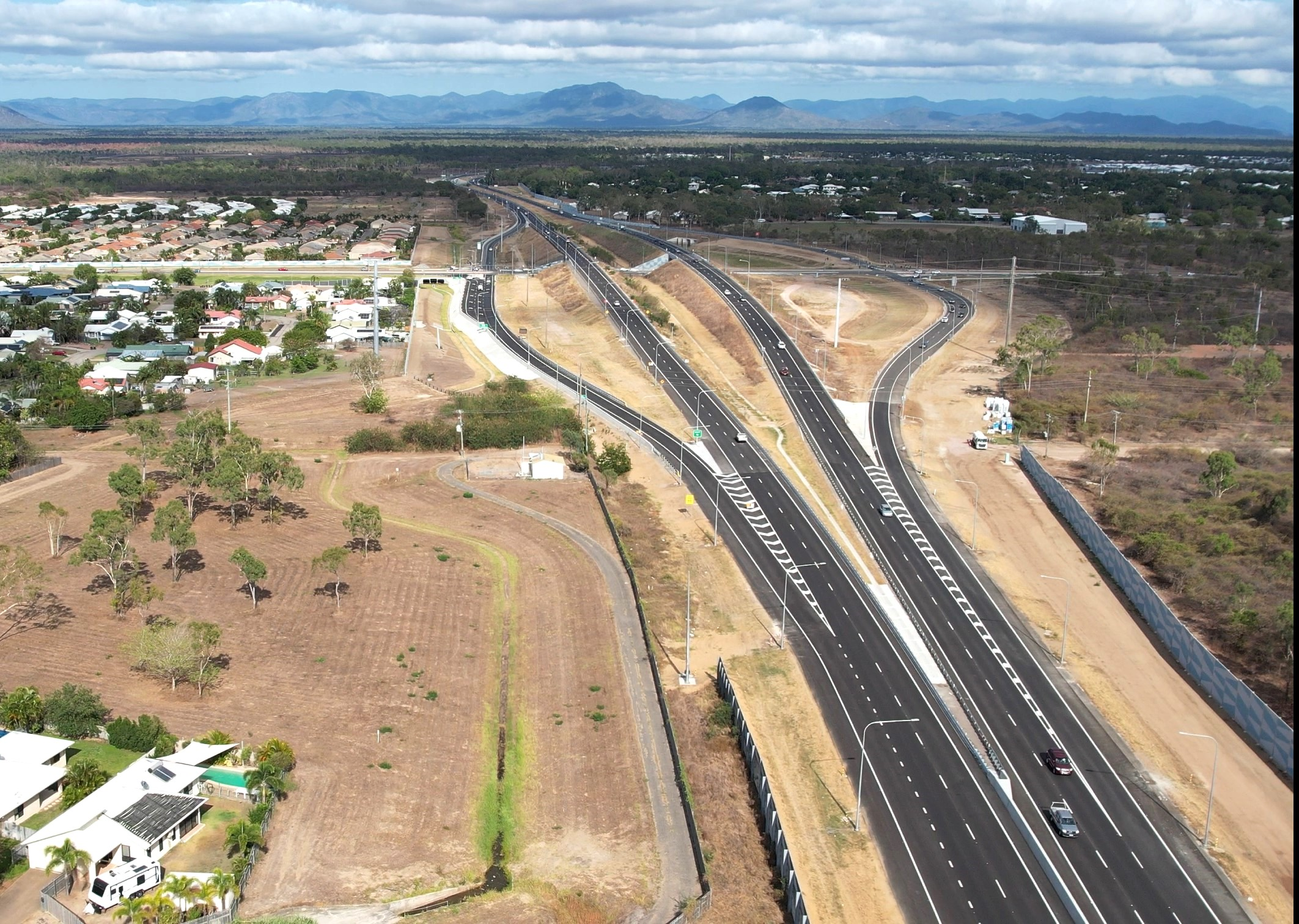
- Grade-separated interchange at Beck Drive

General information
- Type: Motorway
- Location: Townsville
- Length: 19 km (12 mi)
- Opened: April 2005
- Maintained by: Department of Transport & Main Roads
- Route number(s): Bruce Highway

Major junctions
- South-east end: University Road
- Hervey Range Road
- North-west end: North Townsville Road

Highway system
- Highways in Australia; National Highway • Freeways in Australia; Highways in Queensland

The Townsville Ring Road is a motorway in Townsville, Queensland, Australia. The road was constructed as the new A1/M1 (Bruce Highway) route intended to bypass the inner metro area of Townsville. The road was built in 5 stages with the Stage 1, the Douglas Arterial Road, opened in April 2005 and the final stage, Stage 5, opened in October 2023. Stage 5 commenced construction in July 2021 which included the duplication of the remaining 6-kilometre 2-lane undivided section between Vickers Bridge and Shaw Road in Thuringowa.

== History ==
Planning for an alternative Bruce Highway route through Townsville began in the mid-1980s. The existing route, via Nathan Street, ran through a built-up area, past many driveways, side roads and signalised intersections. State and Federal governments agreed that the existing Bruce Highway route through Townsville would be unable to cope with medium to long-term traffic demands. In its concept phase, the Townsville Ring Road was known as the Townsville Bypass. Work was done in the early 1990s to establish a broad preferred alignment for Sections 1, 2 and 3. In 1993 an aerial survey was completed for the section that would eventually become Section 4 - the Bohle Plains Extension.

The Townsville Ring Road was built in 5 stages, effectively split up into four different sections of motorway alignment, which were in some cases followed by projects that duplicated the existing single carriageway sections:

=== Stage 1 - Section 1 ===
Stage 1 was the construction of the Douglas Arterial Road, which opened April 2005. It was initially a two-lane single carriageway, prior to 2012.

=== Stage 2 - Sections 2 & 3 ===
The next sections, the Shaw Road Extension (Section 2) and Condon Bypass (Section 3) opened in 2009. Surveying commenced on 24 October 2006 for the Hervey Range Road Interchange. Construction of the interchange began April 2007. Upon completion, the road was designated as part of Highway 1, with the route number A1, with plans to eventually be numbered M1 following duplication of the entire project (including construction of the Bohle plains Extension).

=== Stage 3 - Duplication of Section 1 ===
Stage 3 was better known as the Douglas Arterial Duplication. This was a duplication of the original motorway alignment constructed in Stage 1 - the Douglas Arterial Road (Section 1). Completed in 2012, this was the first section of the Townsville Ring Road to be upgraded to a dual carriageway.

=== Stage 4 - Section 4 ===
Stage 4 was the Bohle Plains Extension, which opened December 2016. This was effectively the final 'section' of the Townsville Ring Road alignment, approximately 11.5km of dual carriageway that connects Shaw Road across the Bohle Plains to link with the Bruce Highway at Mt Low Parkway.

=== Stage 5 - Duplication of Sections 2 & 3 ===
Stage 5 was a duplication of the original motorway alignment constructed in Stage 2 - the Shaw Road Extension (Section 2) and the Condon Bypass (Section 3). A noteworthy addition to this Stage was the closure of the northbound entry and southbound exit ramps at the Riverway Drive interchange, replaced with a 4-lane ramp interchange at Beck Drive. Construction commenced in July 2021 and was completed in October 2023 at a cost of $280 million. The principal contractor for the project was the Georgiou Group.

== Route description ==
The Douglas Arterial Road is also known as the Ring Road, as part of the broader ring road project, or the Douglas Motorway. The 5.6 kilometres (3.5 mi) section is a dual carriageway separated by concrete barriers built in 2012. It also features a six-lane, 250 metre bridge across the Ross River and Riverway Drive which was constructed upstream of the existing Vickers Bridge (named after the famous Vickers family), along with a two-lane bridge over Discovery Drive and University Creek. There are also grade-separated interchanges at University Road and Angus Smith Drive.

As with the existing Douglas section, the arterial comprises two 3.5 metre-wide lanes with two 2 metre-wide shoulders (a total of 11 metres wide). It is built as a motorway with a speed limit of 100 km/h and the usual restrictions (no mopeds, animals, farm vehicles, cyclists or pedestrians) will apply. New exits and entry ramps were constructed on the Riverside Boulevard overpass connecting the suburb to the Arterial.

With the completion of the dual-carriageway Bohle Plains Extension in 2017 (Stage 4), and the completion of the Vickers Bridge to Shaw Road duplication in October 2023 (Stage 5), the Townsville Ring Road route is now a motorway-grade dual-carriageway throughout the entirety of its 19 km length.

== Major Intersections ==
LGA	Location	km	mi	Destinations	Notes
Townsville	Annandale, Douglas, Mount Stuart tripoint	0	0.0	Douglas–Garbutt Road (University Road) – north–west – Garbutt	Junction of M1 and former Bruce Highway. (Southern end of Townsville Ring Road); No eastbound exit to or westbound entry from University Road.
Townsville	Douglas	1.2	0.75	Angus Smith Drive	Eastbound exit and westbound entrance only.
Townsville	Bohle Plains	8.6	5.3	Hervey Range Road (State Route 72) – west – Hervey Range / east - Thuringowa Central	
Townsville	Deeragun / Mount Low boundary	19.2	11.9	North Townsville Road (former Bruce Highway) – east – Townsville	Junction of M1 and former Bruce Highway. (Northern end of Townsville Ring Road)
1.000 mi = 1.609 km; 1.000 km = 0.621 mi: Incomplete access

== See also ==
- Freeways in Australia
- Freeways in Townsville
