= Townsville CityLibraries =

Public library service in Queensland, Australia

Townsville Citylibraries
- 19.2553°S 146.8229°E
- Location: Townsville, Queensland, Australia
- Type: public library
- Established: 1938

Other information
- Website: www.townsville.qld.gov.au/facilities-and-recreation/libraries

Townsville Citylibraries is a public library service serving the City of Townsville, Queensland, Australia. It has three permanent libraries, a mobile library service and a home service. It is operated by Townsville City Council. Citylibraries serves almost 200,000 residents of Townsville and surrounding areas.

== History ==
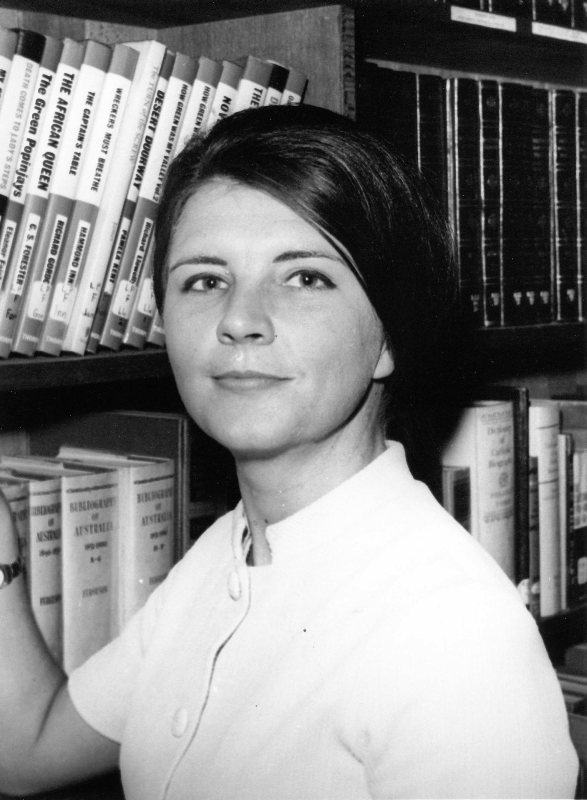
Miss Helen Mays, Townsville City Librarian, 1969

Townsville was the first city in the state of Queensland to open a free public library service in 1938.

In 1986, the Shire of Thuringowa became a separate city and the library service divided; the Aitkenvale and City Library became the Townsville Library Service, and Thuringowa Library became a separate library service. Each had their own mobile library, with Thuringowa operating in the northern suburbs and Townsville in the southern suburbs. In 2008, the cities of Townsville and Thuringowa were amalgamated. The new library service became known as CityLibraries Townsville. The book The History of Townsville Library Service: An institution of help and education by Richard Sayers was published in 2008.

On amalgamation, four sections of service were created: Customer Service and Operations, Lifelong Learning, Information and Digital Services, and Collection Development.

In 2015, following a Council restructure, the four sections were renamed Customer Experience, Learning and Information Services, Planning and Business Information, and Operations Support.

In 2023, following the opening of Citylibraries Riverway, the overarching name of the libraries became known as Townsville Citylibraries, no longer with a capital L.

== Libraries ==
=== Citylibraries Aitkenvale ===
Citylibraries Aitkenvale is located in the central suburb of Aitkenvale, first opened in 1971. The Aitkenvale Library has lounge rooms for the non-fiction collection. Its features include a meeting room with kitchen, separate Teen Area, and an Access Information Centre. There is free wireless internet available.

=== Citylibraries Flinders Street ===
Citylibraries Flinders Street has moved location several times in the Townsville CBD. It has been located on Level 1 of the Northtown Building since 2000. This library houses the Local History Collection and the Programmed Reading Collection. There is free wireless internet available.

=== Citylibraries Riverway ===
Citylibraries Riverway was opened in 2023 and is located in the Riverway precinct. It is the new location for Citylibraries Thuringowa. It includes a creative hub for locals to create and record audio and video, 24-hour meeting and study rooms, a business lounge, parenting room, and 24/7 reservation pick up lockers. There is free wireless internet available.

=== Citylibraries Thuringowa ===
Citylibraries Thuringowa Central was opened in 1986 and was located in Thuringowa Central. This library was home to the Parents' Collection, an outdoor children's play area, and a café. In 2023 after the opening of Citylibraries Riverway, the Thuringowa branch was moved to the new location.

=== Mobile Library ===
The Mobile Library Service was first established in 1981 and provides library access to residents in remote areas around Townsville. This includes the Northern Beaches area, the Alligator Creek and Cungulla area, and a weekly trip to Magnetic Island.

=== Home Service Library ===
The Home Service Library was first established in 1990 and was the first of its kind in Queensland. Customers of the Home Service Library can either enter the Library outside their house or have library staff select their books and resources for them, and have them delivered to their home.

== Indigenous Resources Services ==
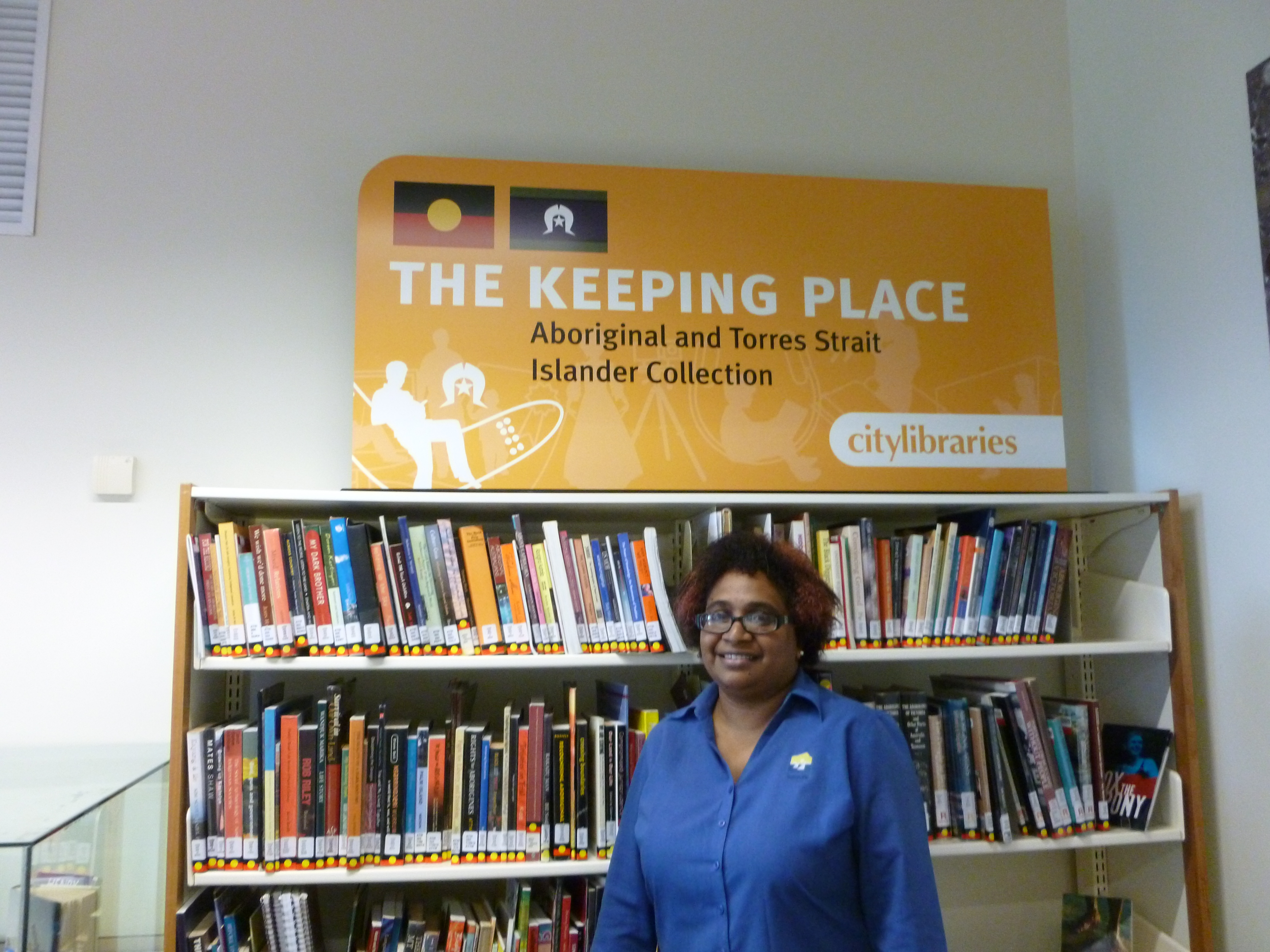

Citylibraries strives to ensure that it addresses the needs of the local Indigenous community and its members. There are four elements within the role of the Indigenous Resource officer's position within Townsville Citylibraries:

1. Family History research assistance including access to the Tindale Collection of family trees and photographs, and the Margaret Lawrie Index is available for Indigenous people in the Townsville area.
2. The Indigenous collection is available at Thuringowa Central, Aitkenvale and Flinders street. Space within each branch is dedicated to lending resources that have an indigenous focus or are written by Indigenous Australians. The collections are continually updated and cover a wide reage of subjects and formats. Fiction, Non-fiction Music, DVD's, Magazines and newspapers, biographies, History, Art. Poetry, Children's Literature, native Title, Bush Tucker and Medicines.
3. Programs - Cultural and general events. An annual program of cultural, artistic, displays, family history workshops, computer training and bookclub sessions is available to the Indigenous community. Cultural events celebrated by the Indigenous community in Townsville include Sorry Day, Coming of the Light, Close the Gap NAIDOC, Reconciliation Week, Mabo Day etc.
4. Networking: Networks and Partnerships are essential to ensure the community needs are met. Local Indigenous organisations have partnered with CityLibraries to provide events specifically targeting cultural awareness.

== Local History Collection ==
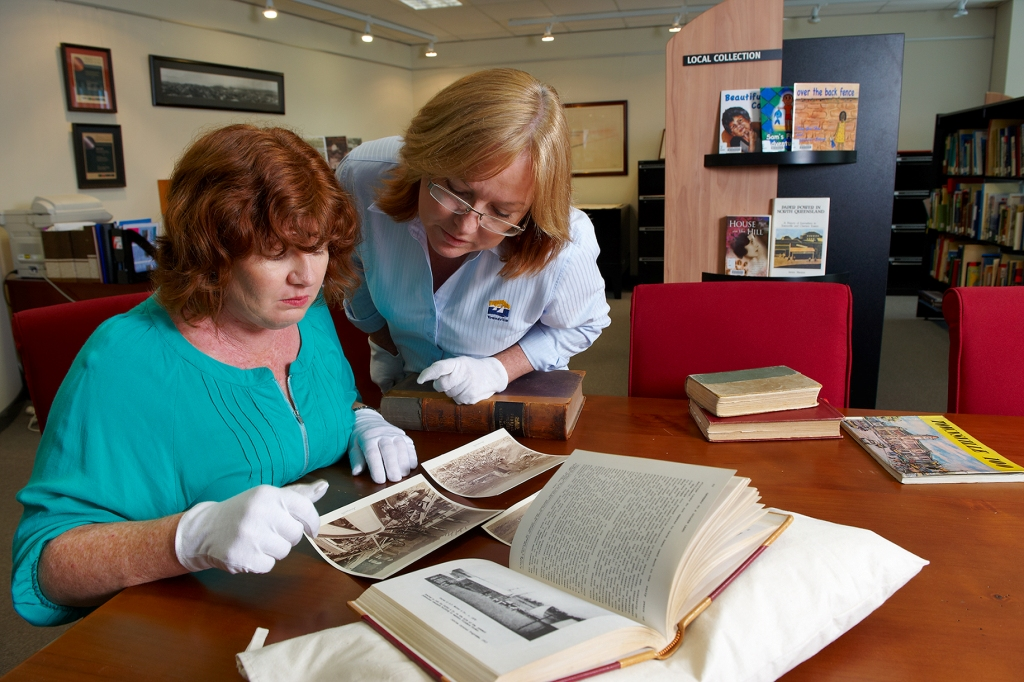
Viewing resources in the, Flinders Street Townsville. Local History Collection room

The Townsville Citylibraries Local History Collection contains information on the history of Townsville and the surrounding area. Citylibraries Flinders Street houses and extensive collection of material related to the history of Townsville. The collection includes books, maps, photographs, pamphlet files, plans, oral histories, newspapers and microfilms.

=== Programs ===
An annual program of Local History and family history talks, educational workshops in the area of database usage, family history software, conservation and preservation is available to the community.

The Townsville Local History Collection is a living collection that is added to on a continual basis.

== Lifelong Learning ==
Citylibraries offers a varied program of lifelong learning, including book clubs and book talks, Tech Savvy Seniors, Computers, Digital Technology, Online Help and 3D Printing sessions, Learning Links, Townsville Reads, and Open Universities Australia Connect Library.

== Digital Hub ==
Digital Hub
