= Aitkenvale State School =

Primary school in Queensland, Australia

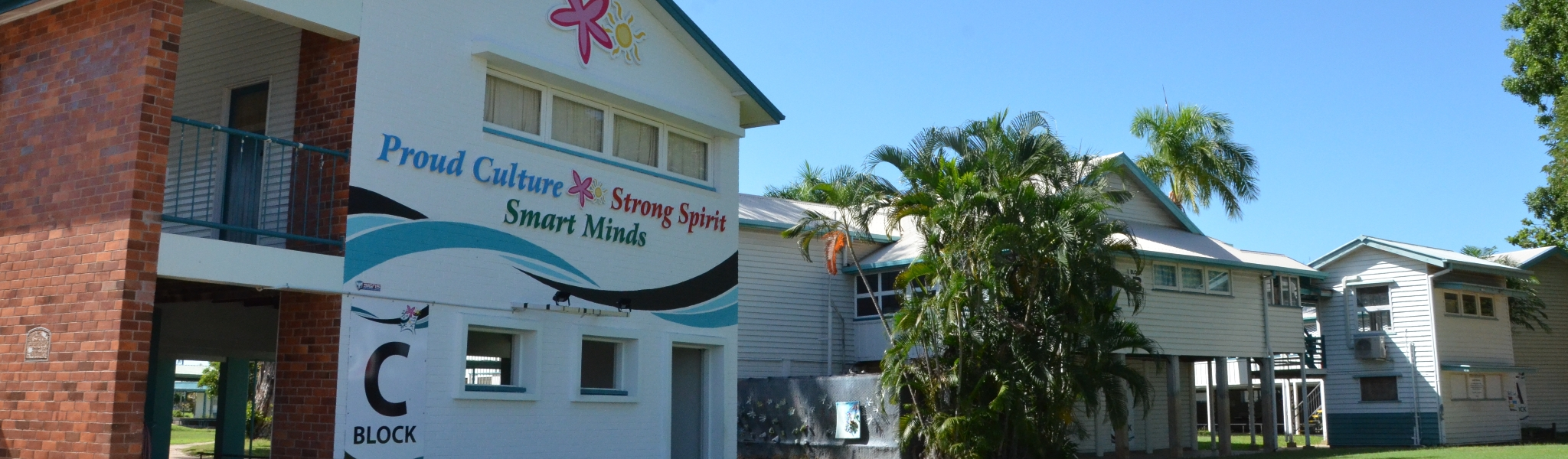
- School Buildings c.2022

Location
- 67-85 Wotton Street; Aitkenvale, Townsville, Queensland, Australia; 19.29594°S 146.76219°E

Information
- Other names: Aitkenvale State Primary School, Aitkenvale Primary School, Aitkenvale Public School
- School type: Public, co-educational, primary
- Motto: Achieving Excellence Together
- Established: 1924
- Principal: Lee Braney
- Years offered: Prep – Year 6
- Enrolment: 349 (2023)
- Website: Official site

Aitkenvale State School is a public co-educational primary school located in the Townsville suburb of Aitkenvale, Queensland, Australia. It is administered by the Queensland Department of Education, with an enrolment of 349 students and a teaching staff of 39, as of 2023. The school serves students from Prep through to Year 6.

== History ==
The school was established on 30 May 1924 and opened on 1 or 2 June 1924. The minister for the Education Department at the time, John Huxham, officially opened the school later that month. It had 49 foundation students.

In December 1940, the school opened an air raid shelter, which is believed to have been the first such shelter constructed in a Queensland school. The school had an enrolment of 82 students at this time. The army also occupied the school during WWII, they took over the teachers' residence in 1942 to feed the troops.

In late 1952, £1,013 in funding was approved for additions at the school to be erected. A new classroom was constructed and completed in early 1953.

The school's enrolment peaked at 1,264 students in 1980. Between 1987 and 1993, the Coca Cola Company used the school's bore for water to use in their Bohle factory.

In 2010, pet chickens at the school were killed and their eggs were thrown against the school buildings. It is unclear if the perpetrator was ever identified.

In March 2014, a teenage boy trespassed into the school and proceeded to step in front of a girl entering the bathroom, however, the girl ran off and the boy was seen leaving the school grounds shortly thereafter. He was charged with stalking, trespassing and stealing.

== Demographics ==
In 2021, the school had a student enrolment of 420 with 50 teachers (44.4 full-time equivalent) and 29 non-teaching staff (21 full-time equivalent). Female enrolments consisted of 201 students and Male enrolments consisted of 219 students; Indigenous enrolments accounted for a total of 26% and 48% of students had a language background other than English.

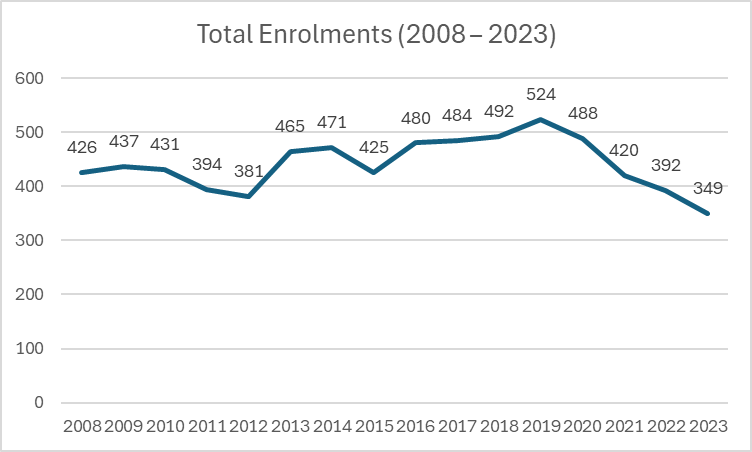
Aitkenvale State School Enrolment Data 2008 to 2023

In 2022, the school had a student enrolment of 392 with 38 teachers (31.6 full-time equivalent) and 30 non-teaching staff (22.7 full-time equivalent). Female enrolments consisted of 198 students and Male enrolments consisted of 194 students; Indigenous enrolments accounted for a total of 29% and 46% of students had a language background other than English.

In 2023, the school had a student enrolment of 349 with 39 teachers (33.6 full-time equivalent) and 26 non-teaching staff (18.5 full-time equivalent). Female enrolments consisted of 181 students and Male enrolments consisted of 168 students; Indigenous enrolments accounted for a total of 24% and 48% of students had a language background other than English.

== Notable staff ==
- Margaret Reynolds, politician

== Notable alumni ==
- Lizette Cabrera, tennis player
- Kyle Feldt, rugby league player
- Aaron Payne, rugby league footballer and coach
- Janelle Poole, politician

== See also ==
- Education in Queensland
- List of schools in North Queensland
