= Heatley =

Heatley is a surname of both English and Scottish origin.

There appear to be several English origins of Heatley.

The earliest references to the surname in Scotland are in the 13th century in the Borders region. The de Haitlie family held lands where Mellerstain Castle is now situated. The lands were closely linked to those of Fans (Faunes) and are mentioned in the early 13th century when they subdivided into tofts which were owned by the de Hattely or de Haitley family, Richard of Fans and his half-brother David de Graham, amongst others. Grants and donations of land at Mellerstain were made to both Durham Priory and Kelso Abbey, and some time between 1265 and 1285 William de Hattely granted the abbot of Kelso the right to pass through his lands of Mellerstain and permission to build a bridge over the Blackburn above his house. By the end of the 13th century these lands seemed in possession of the Haliburton family.

The Scottish Heatley surname has evolved over the centuries and has taken on various spellings.

Notable people with the surname include:

- Basil Heatley (1933–2019), British athlete
- Bill Heatley (1920–1971), Australian politician
- Bob Heatley (1895–1973), Australian footballer
- Craig Heatley (born 1956), New Zealand businessman
- Danny Heatley:
  - Danny Heatley (musician), British drummer
  - Dany Heatley (born 1981), Canadian ice hockey player
- David Heatley (born 1974), American cartoonist
- Jason Heatley (born 1972), Australian footballer
- Johnny Rock Heatley, American guitarist
- Murray Heatley (born 1948), former Canadian ice hockey player
- Michael Heatley, Author
- Norman George Heatley (1911–2004), British biochemist, Penicillin co-discoverer
- Philip Reeve Heatley (born 1967), New Zealand politician
- Ramsay Heatley Traquair (1840–1912), Scottish naturalist
- Spike Heatley (1933–2021), British jazz bassist
- Tamsin Heatley, British actress

== See also ==
- Heatley & Warburton railway station
