= Condon, Queensland =

Condon
- Suburb
- Interactive map of Condon
- Coordinates: 19.3297°S 146.7166°E
- Country: Australia
- State: Queensland
- City: Townsville
- LGA: City of Townsville
- Location: 15.4 km (9.6 mi) SW of Townsville CBD; 1,362 km (846 mi) NNW of Brisbane
- Established: 1968

Government
  - State electorate: Thuringowa
  - Federal division: Herbert

Area
  - Total: 5.3 km^{2} (2.0 sq mi)

Population
  - Total: 5,894 (2021 census)
  - Density: 1,112/km^{2} (2,880/sq mi)
- Time zone: UTC+10:00 (AEST)
- Postcode: 4815
Suburbs around Condon
Bohle Plains	Kirwan	Thuringowa Central
Gumlow	Condon	Douglas; Mount Stuart
Gumlow	Rasmussen	Rasmussen

Condon is a suburb of Townsville in the City of Townsville, Queensland, Australia. In the 2021 census, Condon had a population of 5,894 people.

== Geography ==
Condon is part of the Upper Ross District and is the first of three suburbs along Riverway Drive. Townsville's Ring road (now part of the Bruce Highway) runs through Condon with the Vickers Bridge across the Ross River connecting Condon with Douglas and the southern suburbs. Thuringowa State High School is also in this suburb.

Hervey Range Road runs along the northern boundary, and Garbutt–Upper Ross Road (Riverway Drive) runs along the eastern.

== History ==
Condon's first residential development was in 1968. It was named by Queensland Place Names Board on 1 March 1969 after the Irish Condon family (William Condon) who had settled on the Ross River and had a dairy farm.

Thuringowa State High School opened on 27 January 1987.

Shalom Christian College was established in 1992 by Uniting Aboriginal and Islander Christian Congress (part of the Uniting Church of Australia). Following allegations of sexual assault in 2006 that led to criticisms of the school's handling of the situation, in 2017 the Uniting Church announced that they would close the secondary and boarding components of the school. In 2018 Carinity purchased the school from the Uniting Church with the intention of re-instating its secondary education program.

== Demographics ==
In the 2016 census, Condon had a population of 5,779 people.

In the 2021 census, Condon had a population of 5,894 people.

== Education ==
Thuringowa State High School is a government secondary (7–12) school for boys and girls at 26–54 Vickers Road South (19.3365°S 146.7190°E). In 2017, the school had an enrolment of 726 students with 64 teachers (63 full-time equivalent) and 45 non-teaching staff (33 full-time equivalent). It includes a special education program.

Shalom Christian College is a private primary and secondary (Prep–12) school for boys and girls at 190 Hervey's Range Road (19.3197°S 146.7110°E). In 2017, the school had an enrolment of 251 students with 25 teachers (24 full-time equivalent) and 54 non-teaching staff (46 full-time equivalent).

There are no government primary schools in Condon. The nearest government primary schools are the Weir State School in Thuringowa Central, The Willows State School in Kirwan and Rasmussen State School in Rasmussen, all neighbouring suburbs.
