= Townsville Shopping Centre =

Coordinates: 19°17′56″S 146°45′48.5″E

- Location: Aitkenvale, Townsville, Queensland, Australia
- Developer: Stockland
- Manager: Haben Property Fund
- Owner: Haben Property Fund
- Num. of stores: 205
- Num. of anchor tenants: 5
- Floor area: 46,000 m2
- Floors: 2
- Parking: 3,000
- Website: Townsville Shopping Centre

Townsville Shopping Centre (formerly Stockland Townsville') is centrally located in Aitkenvale within the urban area of Townsville, Queensland, Australia. In 1987 Townsville Shopping Centre opened after a major upgrade to what was previously known as Nathan Plaza (named after the street the centre runs along). In October 2012 Townsville Shopping Centre opened a new 2 level Myer department store, a new Woolworths and mini major, Rebel, plus other specialty stores including a 750-seat foodcourt. The centre is also home to Townsville's first Big W store.

In September 2012, Centro sold the centre located across the road (home to Kmart and Coles) to Stockland, with it renamed from Centro Townsville to Stockland Townsville. It has since been renamed The Intersection. In September 2023, Dexus sold its 50% shareholding to the Haben Property Group. In December 2023 purchased the other 50% from Stockland with the centre renamed Townsville Shopping Centre.

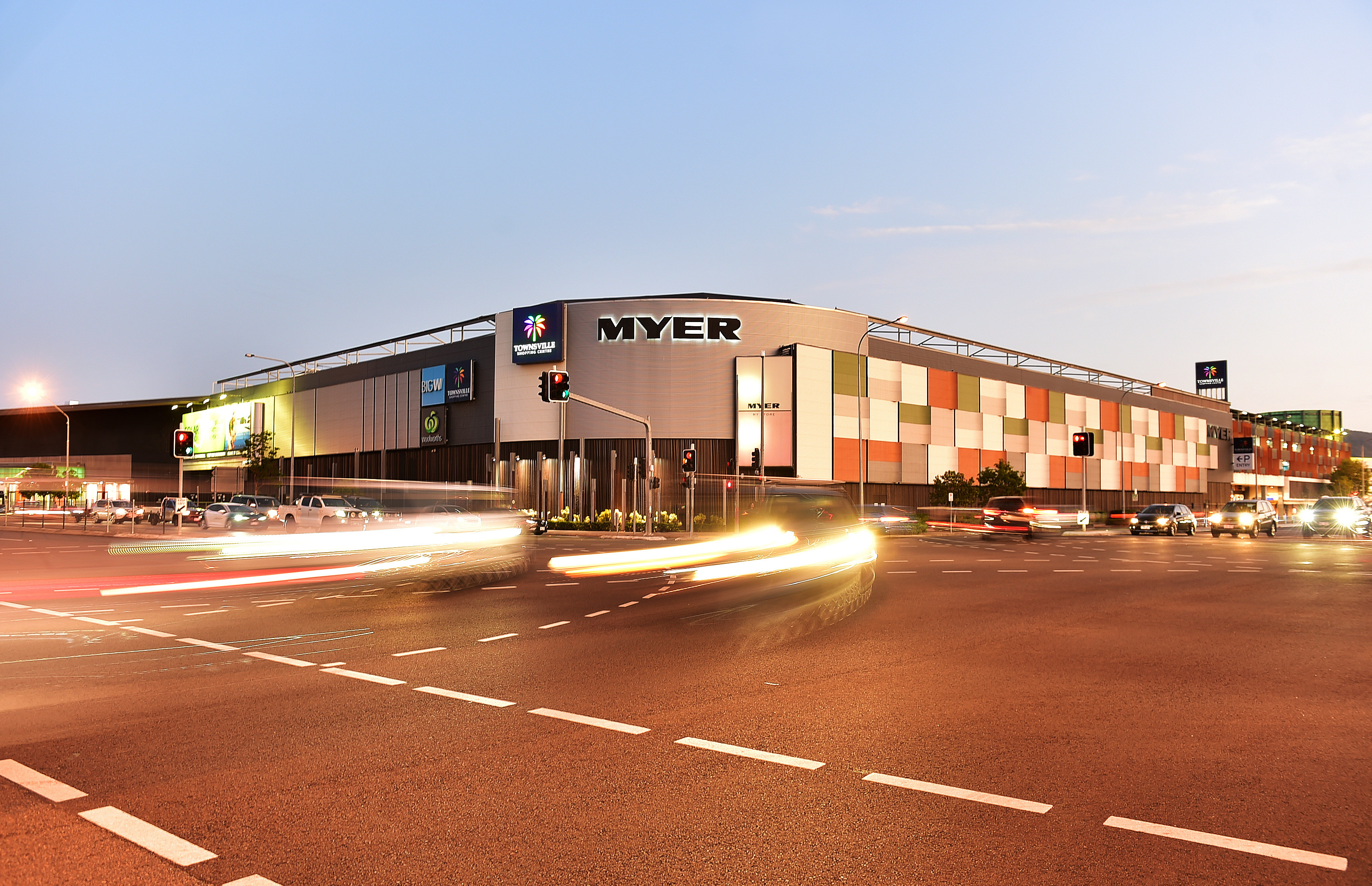

== Public transport ==
Townsville Shopping Centre is accessible by bus, and is one of the major bus interchanges on the Translink Townsville network. This is located on Ross River Road at the centre entrance. The taxi interchange is located at the main centre entrance as well.
