= Riverway, Townsville =

Coordinates: 19°19′09″S 146°43′48″E

Riverway is a riverfront parkland attraction located in the Condon Suburb of Townsville that opened in July 2006. It stretches along 11 km (7 mi) of the Ross River, with areas at Pioneer Park, Loam Island, Apex Park and Ross Park at the Ross River Dam. The areas of Riverway that have been completed are Pioneer Park and Loam Island. Riverway is connected directly to the Thuringowa Central business district via a pathway along the foreshore.

== Village Boulevard ==
Village Boulevard is the name of the road into Pioneer Park and forms the city/park integration. From the car park it extends through the park as a pedestrian spine that follows the rivers edge and forms the heart of Pioneer Park.

== Tony Ireland Stadium ==
The Tony Ireland Stadium is part of the second stage of Riverway and consists of an international standard AFL and cricket stadium with a capacity of 10,000+.

== Riverway Arts Centre ==
Riverway Arts Centre is a geographical formation that is integrated into the surrounding parkland, without decreasing the available grassed area. It also lowers the interior temperature by reducing the roof surface temperature. The Pinnacles Art Gallery is also in this building. The Australian improvised music trio, The Necks recorded their third live album, Townsville (2007), at the Riverway Arts Centre.

== Riverway's Village precinct ==
Riverway's Village precinct is a planned retail and dining strip with exclusive boutiques, gift shops, health and beauty salons and gourmet food outlets. Construction of this precinct is to commence in 2008/9.

== History ==
Before what is now the Riverway, this area was a Camping Reserve for the army's R72 and after the future of Camping Reserve (Renamed R326) was being debated and had been left unused, the then Thuringowa Shire Council made a decision that the area remain un-subdivided for community use, and with the demand for recreational space growing, along with the Upper Ross population, this area was the best location.

In 1970 poisoning and bulldozing of the Chinee Apple trees started, along with drainage works and mowing. The road that traveled along the river was closed to traffic and clubhouses and toilets were built on the site in 1971. It was a pre-war tradition to plant raintrees in the reserve and this was continued by the Thuringowa Council. These trees still stand today, shading the roadway into the Riverway.

During the early 1970s the Thuringowa Council and residents entered into discussion's about what to name the reserve, suggestions including: Upper Ross Sports Complex, The Kirwan Sports Reserve, Vickers Park, Ross River Memorial Park and Upper Ross Memorial Park, however the Thuringowa Council officially named the reserve the Pioneer Sporting Complex in October 1971.

Over the years, Pioneer Sporting Complex had many small upgrades and was and still is used by many sporting teams and clubs, and became better known as 'Pioneer Park'. However, as the population of Thuringowa was growing at a fast rate the need for more recreational activities in the area also increased.,

=== Construction ===
Riverway Stage One included the construction of two swimming lagoons, the Riverway Arts Centre, Pinnacles Gallery, the Riverwalk, public art, village spine and parklands. Stage Two involved the construction of the Riverway Stadium, now named the Tony Ireland Stadium. Stage Three is the area consisting of Apex Park and the Upper Ross Shopping Centre area.

== Itara at Riverway ==
Itara at Riverway is a medium density residential development, consisting of 265 apartments which have helped to pay for the Riverway development.

== See also ==
- Riverway Homepage
- Itara at Riverway
