= Bob Heatley =

Australian rules footballer (1895–1973)

Personal information
- Full name: Robert Clive Heatley
- Born: 6 July 1895; Carlton, Victoria
- Died: 22 February 1973 (aged 77); Kew, Victoria
- Original team: Scotch College

Playing career^{1}
Years	Club	Games (Goals)
1914	University	4 (0)
- ^{1} Playing statistics correct to the end of 1914.

Robert Clive Heatley (6 July 1895 – 22 February 1973) was an Australian rules footballer who played with University in the Victorian Football League (VFL). After University left the VFL at the end of the 1914 season, he remained with the club when it resumed in the Metropolitan Amateur Football Association (MAFA) in 1915.

After his brief football career Heatley served in France during World War I, being mentioned in despatches for acting "as a runner between Brigade Headquarters and Batteries invariably under heavy enemy shell fire".
