= Mandurah Estuary Bridge =

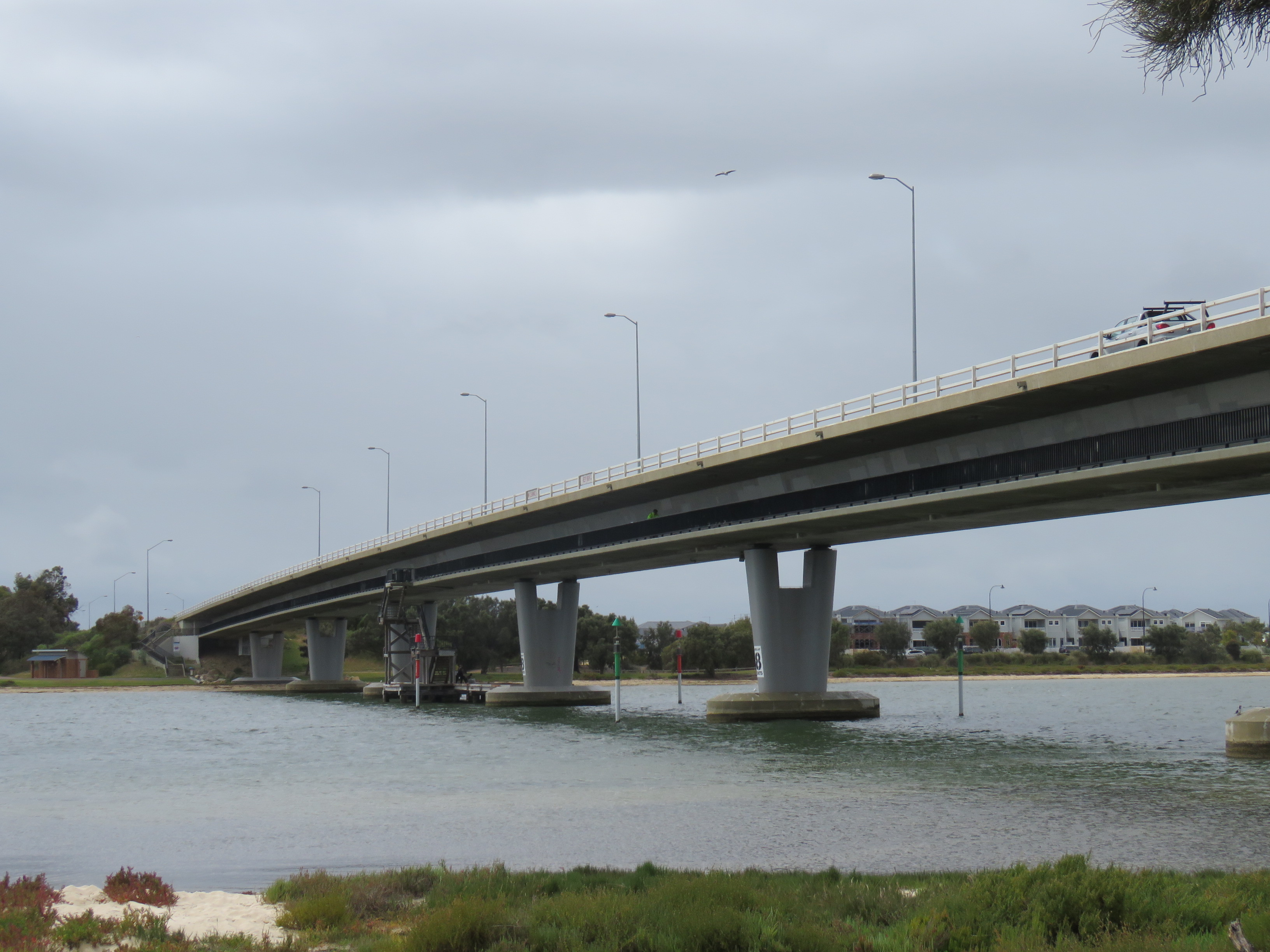
- Mandurah Estuary Bridge in October 2021
- Coordinates: 32.5490°S 115.7177°E
- Carries: Mandurah Road
- Crosses: Peel Inlet
- Locale: Mandurah
- Owner: Main Roads Western Australia

Characteristics
- No. of lanes: 4

History
- Constructed by: Georgiou Group (2nd bridge)
- Opened: 18 October 1986 (1st bridge); 4 February 2026 (2nd bridge)

Location
- Interactive map of Mandurah Estuary Bridge

The Mandurah Estuary Bridge carries Mandurah Road over the Peel Inlet in Mandurah, Western Australia.

== History ==
The Mandurah Estuary Bridge was opened on 18 October 1986 as a two lane structure with provision made for duplication in the future. In October 2023 the Georgiou Group was awarded a contract to build a parallel bridge to increase the number of lanes to four. The new bridge opened on 4 February 2026.
