= Mooro–Beeloo Bridge =

Bridge in Perth, Western Australia

Coordinates: 31°55′47″S 115°56′12″E

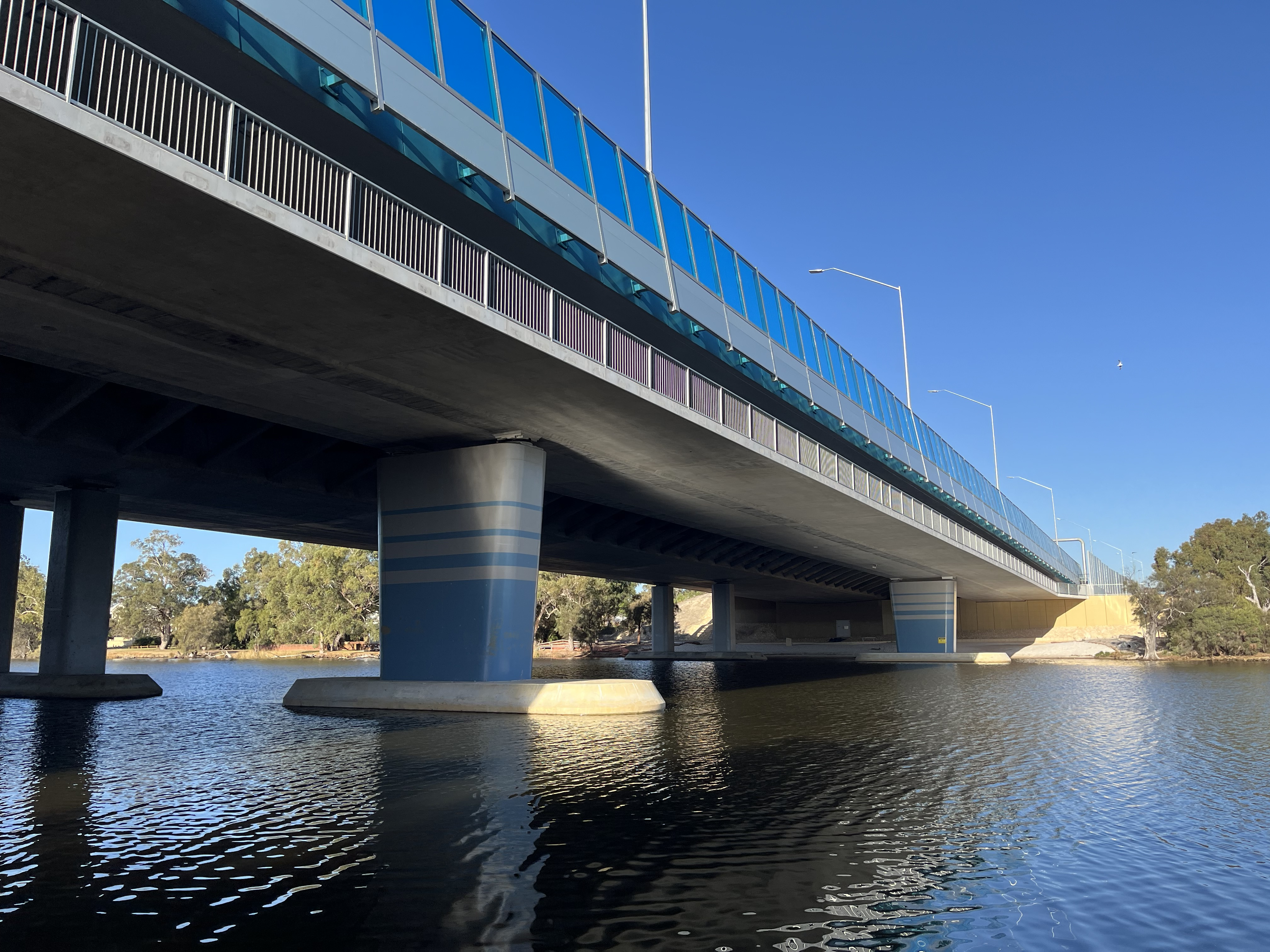
The Mooro–Beeloo Bridge, viewed from the northern bank in 2025

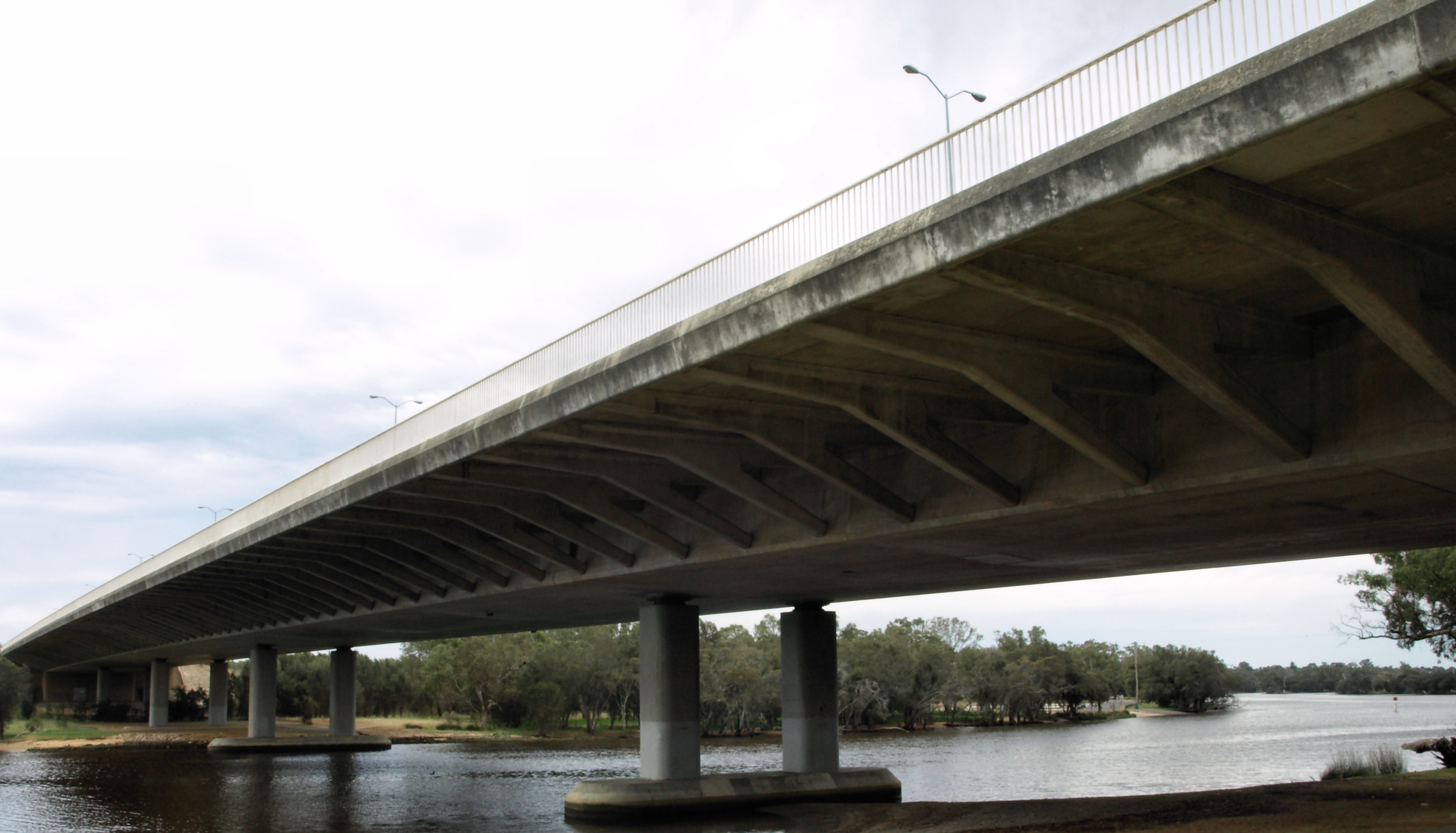
The Mooro–Beeloo Bridge, viewed from the southern bank in 2008

The Mooro–Beeloo Bridge, formerly the Redcliffe Bridge, is a traffic bridge which carries Tonkin Highway across the Swan River between the Perth suburbs of Ascot and Bayswater. It was originally named after the nearby suburb of Redcliffe; it was renamed in December 2023 following the completion of upgrades to the bridge and Tonkin Highway. "Mooro" and "Beeloo" are the names for the Whadjuk clans that lived in territory north and south of the Swan River respectively.

The bridge was designed by Maunsell & Partners and built by Thiess Contractors; construction started in 1986. The bridge was constructed using an incremental launch technique in order not to obstruct river traffic, and cost A$15 million to complete. It was officially opened on 16 April 1988. The bridge is 271 metres (889 ft) long, with five spans and a pre-stressed concrete deck 34 metres (112 ft) wide, supporting six lanes of traffic and two footpaths that were designed to be able to be converted into traffic lanes later. The structure of the bridge is that of a hollow box girder, with the outer sides of the deck supported by special Y-beams. A shared-use path was opened underneath the bridge in March 2023. A small BMX and mountain bike park was opened underneath the bridge on the Bayswater side of the river in March 2024.
