= Mandurah Traffic Bridge =

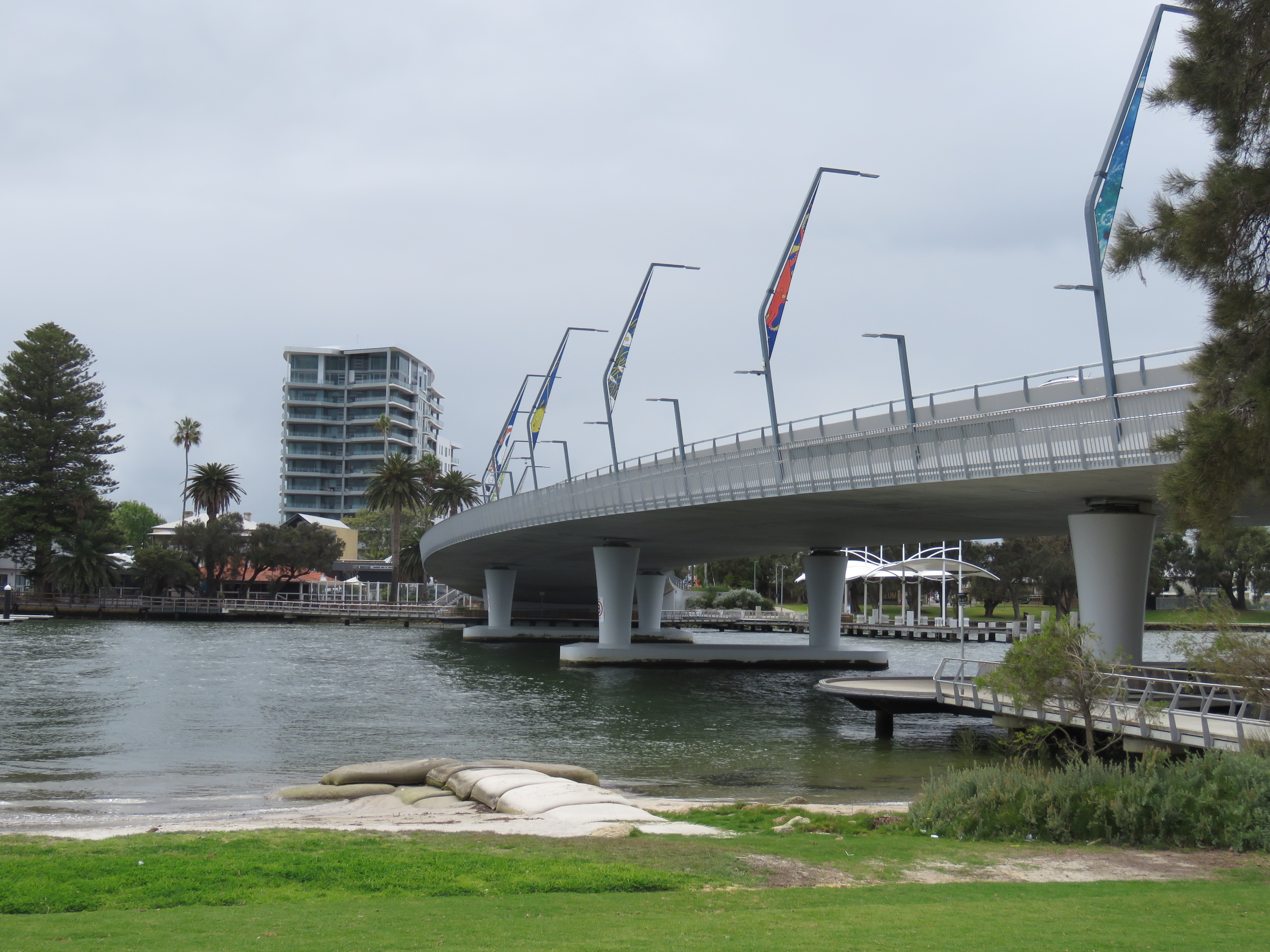
- Mandurah Traffic Bridge in October 2021
- Coordinates: 32.5349°S 115.7176°E
- Carries: Pinjarra Road
- Crosses: Peel Inlet
- Locale: Mandurah
- Owner: Main Roads Western Australia

Characteristics
- No. of lanes: 4

History
- Constructed by: Georgiou Group
- Opened: 15 December 2017

Location
- Interactive map of Mandurah Traffic Bridge

The Mandurah Traffic Bridge carries Pinjarra Road over the Peel Inlet in Mandurah, Western Australia.

== History ==
The first Mandurah Traffic Bridge was completed in May 1894. Built out of jarrah and karri, it was a pile bridge, had 70 piles, and was 180 m (590 ft) long. In 1950, construction began on a replacement with reinforced concrete piers with the rest of the bridge built out of jarrah. It opened on 17 April 1953.

In March 2015, tenders were called for the construction of a replacement with the contract awarded to the Georgiou Group. Construction commenced in July 2016 with the bridge opened on 15 December 2017.
