= Aitkenvale, Queensland =

Aitkenvale
- Suburb
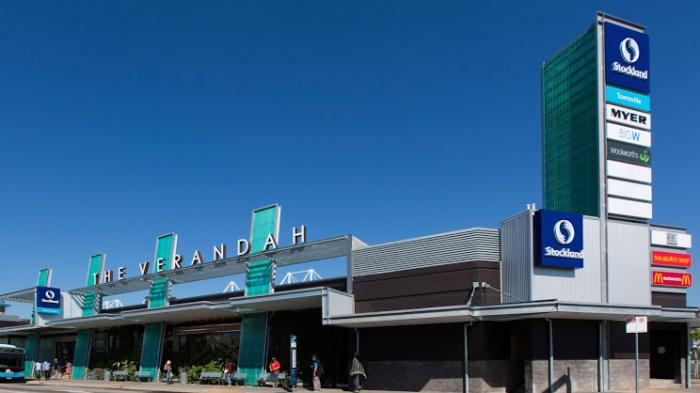
- Stockland Townsville

- Interactive map of Aitkenvale
- Coordinates: 19.3055°S 146.7677°E
- Country: Australia
- State: Queensland
- City: Townsville
- LGA: City of Townsville
- Location: 7.6 km (4.7 mi) SW of Townsville CBD; 1,336 km (830 mi) NNW of Brisbane

Government
  - State electorate: Mundingburra
  - Federal division: Herbert

Area
  - Total: 3.3 km^{2} (1.3 sq mi)

Population
  - Total: 4,797 (2021 census)
  - Density: 1,454/km^{2} (3,760/sq mi)
- Time zone: UTC+10:00 (AEST)
- Postcode: 4814
Suburbs around Aitkenvale
Heatley	Vincent	Gulliver
Cranbrook	Aitkenvale	Mundingburra
Douglas	Annandale	Annandale

Aitkenvale is a suburb of Townsville in the City of Townsville, Queensland, Australia. In the 2021 census, Aitkenvale had a population of 4,797 people.

== Geography ==
Aitkenvale is a major commercial and residential district of the city. The suburb is home to Townsville's biggest shopping centre and is home to branches of numerous companies. Aitkenvale is the biggest commercial centre in Townsville outside of the Townsville CBD, and is often referred to as the second CBD. Besides offices and shopping centres, the suburb is mainly residential and has some light industrial warehouses and workshops in the top north-eastern corner of the suburb. There is also a picturesque parkland along the bank of the Ross River.

Ross River Road runs through from east to west, and Douglas–Garbutt Road (Nathan Street) runs along the western boundary.

== History ==
Aitkenvale is situated in the traditional Wulgurukaba Aboriginal country.

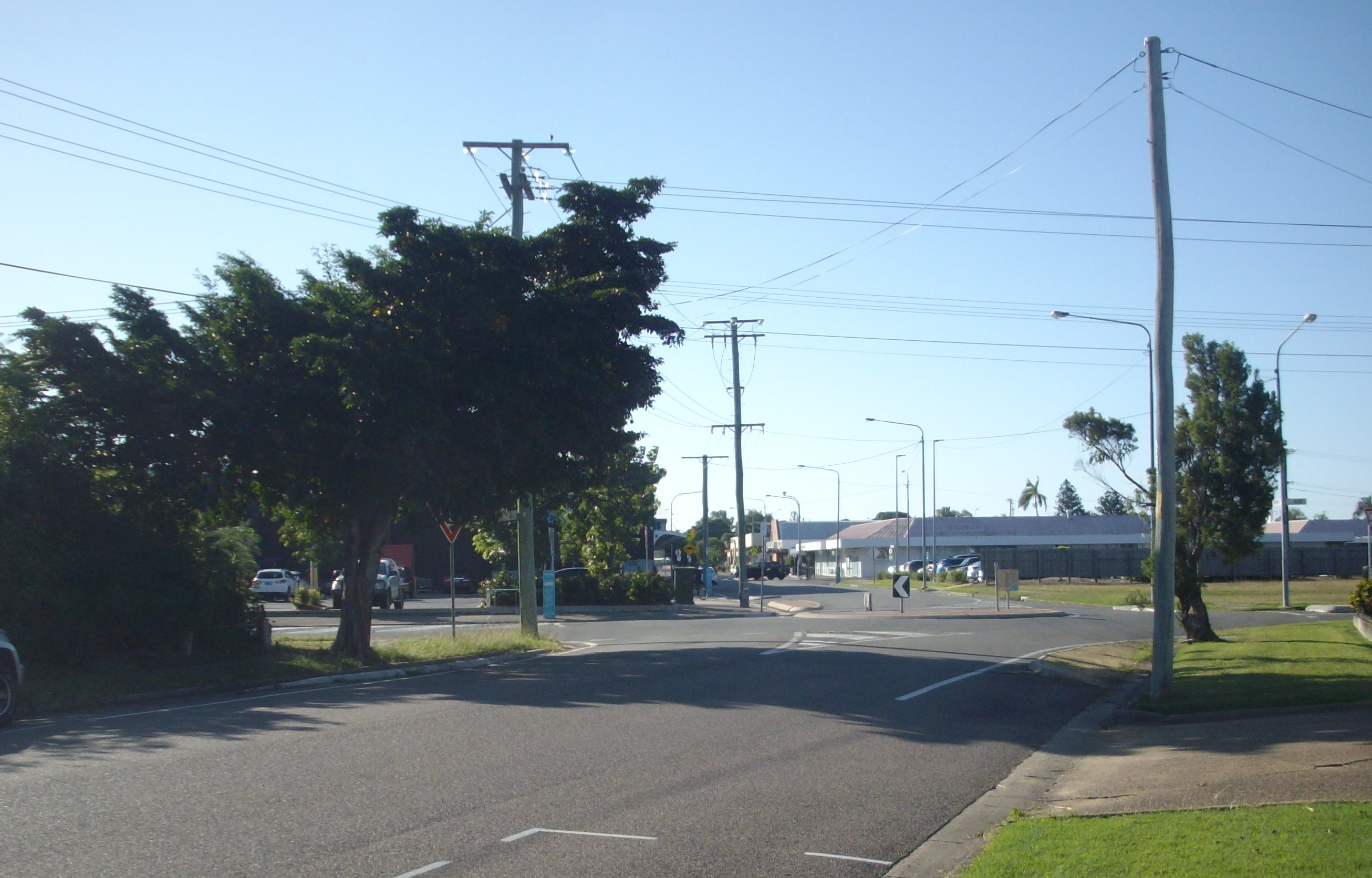
View of roundabout at Elizabeth Street and Alfred Street

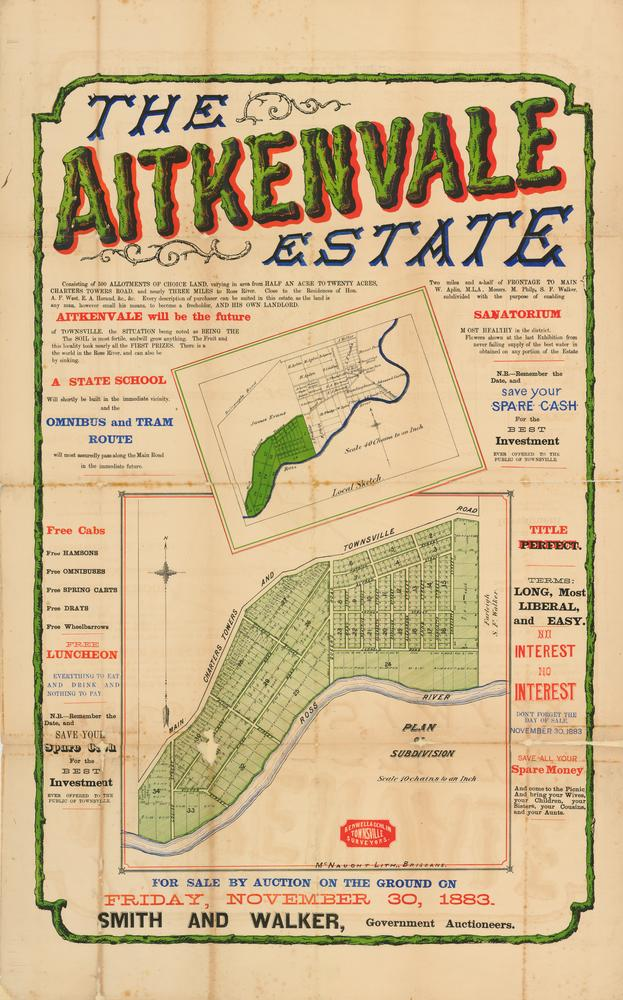
Estate Map of Aitkenvale Estate, Townsville, Queensland, 1883

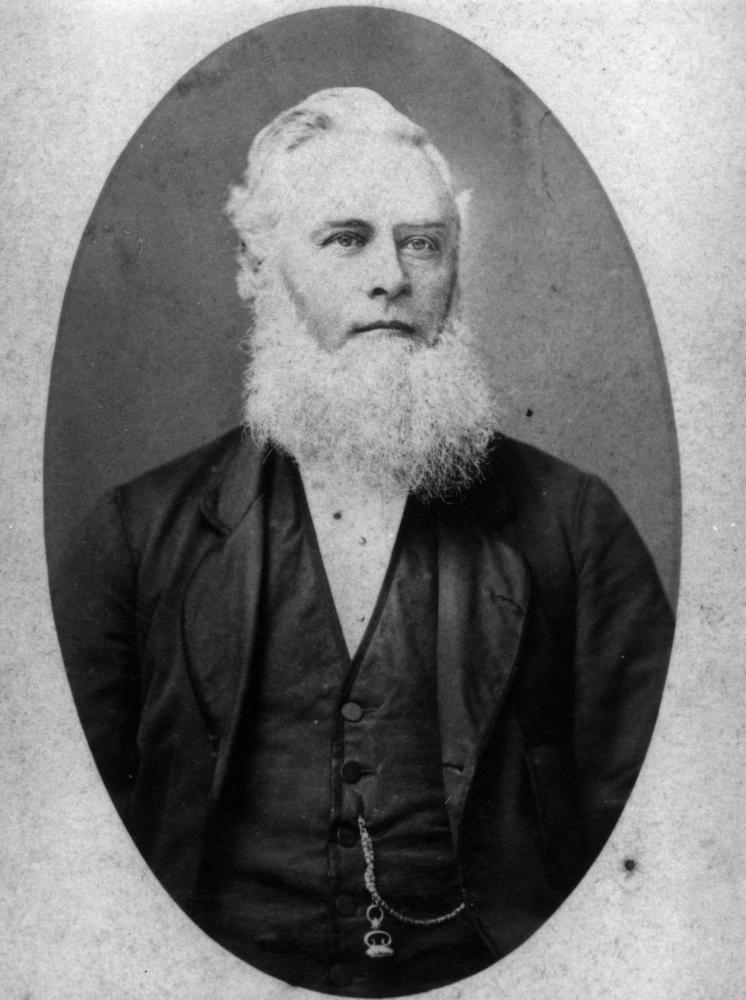
Thomas Aitken of Townsville, 1867

The suburb is named after Thomas Aitken, the original grantee of Portion 38, Parish of Coonambelah. He began subdividing the property during the 1880s, putting 440 quarter-acre residential allotments on the market in 1885. A dairy farm was established in the region by Thomas Aitken in about 1867; the two remaining buildings of this farm (described as the Herdsman's Cottage and Cordial Factory) are still standing on what is now Leopold Street adjacent to Ross River.

Aitkenvale Methodist Church opened in 1885 on its current site. It was a small hall that was destroyed by Cyclone Sigma in 1896. Church services were then held in private homes until a new hall was built in 1914. During World War II, the Royal Australian Air Force occupied the building with services again being held in private homes. In 1959 the church building was moved to the western side of the block (where it still stands) in preparation for a new church to be built. The new brick church was officially opened in 1971. In 1975 the church initiated the Lifeline telephone counselling service in Townsville. With the creation of the Uniting Church in Australia in 1977, the Aitkenvale Methodist Church merged with St Stephen's Presbyterian Church to form the Aitkenvale Uniting Church.

The Townsville Golf Club is the oldest golf club in Queensland, having been established at Kissing Point in 1893. The club relocated to Aitkenvale in 1921, and then relocated to Rosslea in 1924.

Aitkenvale State School opened on 2 June 1924. During World War II, it was occupied by the Australian Armed Forces.

During the Second World War, Aitkenvale was home to the US Army's 13th Station Hospital, which comprised a 450-bed facility, located on the corner of Hatchett Street and Ross River Road. Also, during the war, The area was the site of an aerodrome, located near Aitkenvale Weir on the banks of the Ross River. It was built in 1942 for the Royal Australian Air Force as part of a group of wartime airfields. The facility fell into disuse following the war, with the land eventually being redeveloped for housing.

In 1963, an Aboriginal reserve was built at Aitkenvale for use as a hostel for Aboriginal and Torres Strait Islanders visiting the city for hospital treatment (at the Second Townsville General Hospital, North Ward). In addition, it also provided accommodation for the families of those attending hospital, and was used as a camping ground for visitors to Townsville for sporting or cultural activities.

Riverside Adventist Christian School opened on 14 January 1968.

The Aitkenvale public library opened in 1971.

Aitkenvale Special School opened on 28 August 1972. It closed on 31 December 2001, to be merged with Mundingburra Special School in Mundingburra to create the Townsville Community Learning Centre on the site of the former Mundingburra Special School.

The suburb was affected by the 2019 Townsville flood with riverside areas around Thompson Street inundated, along with Ross River Road adjacent to the Aitkenvale Library where two bodies were found nearby in the aftermath.

== Demographics ==
In the 2016 census, Aitkenvale had a population of 4,790 people, 50.1% female and 49.9% male with 6.7% being Indigenous Australian. The median age was 36 years old, 2 years below the national median of 38. 73.3% of people were born in Australia. The other top responses for country of birth were New Zealand 1.9%, England 1.9%, India 1.4%, Philippines 1.2% and Somalia 1.0%. 79.0% of people spoke only English at home; the next most common languages were 2.2% Somali, 1.0% Mandarin, 0.9% Swahili, 0.8% Vietnamese and 0.6% Karen. The most common responses for religion were No Religion 27.0%, Catholic 23.8% and Anglican 14.0%.

In the 2021 census, Aitkenvale had a population of 4,797 people, 50.1% female and 49.9% male with 8.1% being Indigenous Australian. The median age was 36 years old, 2 years below the national median of 38. 72.6% of people were born in Australia. The other top responses for country of birth were India 1.9%, New Zealand 1.8%, England 1.5%, the Philippines 1.4% and Somalia 0.9%. 76.5% of people spoke only English at home; the next most common languages were 1.9% Swahili, 1.6% Somali, 0.7% Punjabi, 0.6% Tagalog and 0.6% Mandarin. The most common responses for religion were No Religion 35.4%, Catholic 18.6% and Anglican 10.8%.

== Education ==
Aitkenvale State School is a government primary (Prep–6) school for boys and girls at 67–85 Wotton Street (19.2967°S 146.7630°E). In 2018, the school had an enrolment of 492 students with 42 teachers (39 full-time equivalent) and 26 non-teaching staff (18 full-time equivalent). It includes an intensive English language program.

Riverside Adventist Christian School is a private primary (Prep–6) school for boys and girls at 59 Leopold Street (19.3056°S 146.7677°E). In 2018, the school had an enrolment of 50 students with 5 teachers (4 full-time equivalent) and 3 non-teaching staff (2 full-time equivalent).

There are no secondary schools in Aitkenvale. The nearest government secondary schools are Heatley Secondary College in neighbouring Heatley to the north-west and Pimlico State High School in neighbouring Gulliver to the north-east.

== Amenities ==
=== Shopping ===
Townsville Shopping Centre is a shopping centre on the block bounded by Nathan Street, Ross River Road, Elizabeth Street and Alfred Street (19.2993°S 146.7631°E) with the following major tenants:

- Myer
- Big W
- Woolworths
- Kmart (Cranbrook end)
- Coles (Cranbrook end)

=== Parks ===
There are a number of parks in the area:

- Aitkenvale Park (19.2940°S 146.7717°E)
- Illich Park (19.2942°S 146.7652°E)
- Leopold Street Park (19.3065°S 146.7672°E)
- Riverview Park (19.3076°S 146.7729°E)
- Rossiter Park (19.3067°S 146.7633°E)
- Sabadine Street Park (19.2910°S 146.7727°E)

=== Churches ===
Aitkenvale Uniting Church is at 277–279 Ross River Road (19.2965°S 146.7676°E).

=== Public Libraries ===
- CityLibraries Aitkenvale at 4 Petunia Street, operated by CityLibraries Townsville

=== Sporting Grounds ===
- Illich Park (Centrals Rugby League)
- Aitkenvale Park (Saints Eagles Souths Football Club)

== Sources ==
- Heuschele, Margaret (2000). In the Shadow of Castle Hill. Townsville: Townsville Library Service. ISBN 1-875830-41-3.
