= Thuringowa State High School =

Secondary school in Australia

Coordinates: 19°20′12″S 146°43′06″E

- 26–54 Vickers Road South, Condon, Queensland, Australia

Information
- Motto: Promoting Achievement
- Established: 1987
- Principal: Peter Stumer
- Grades: 7–12
- Enrollment: 678 (2023)
- Website: Official site

Thuringowa State High School is a public co-educational secondary school located in the Townsville suburb of Condon, Queensland, Australia. It is administered by the Queensland Department of Education, with an enrolment of 678 students and a teaching staff of 61, as of 2023. The school serves students from Year 7 to Year 12, predominantly from the neighbouring suburbs of Condon, Rasmussen, Kelso and Kirwan, Notably a main part of this school is that the uniform policy is heavily strict and required, students will be sent to the office if out of uniform, the only exception being on days which free clothes are allowed.

== History ==
The school opened on 27 January 1987, under the name Condon, but later renamed to its current name, with year 8, 9 and 11 students.

Thuringowa high school was State finalist in the inaugural Showcase Awards.

In 2023, a trial was conducted with the Year 7 cohort, to identify if weekly mindfulness sessions would improve learning, overall focus, communication and resilience within the students. It was identified that the program had made significant difference to students' behaviour and engagement, which made classroom management easier.

== Extra curriculars ==
It offers programs in sport, cultural achievement, the Theatre Restaurant and Vocational education, amongst others.

== See also ==
- List of schools in North Queensland
- City of Thuringowa
