= Thuringowa Central, Queensland =

Thuringowa Central Townsville, Queensland
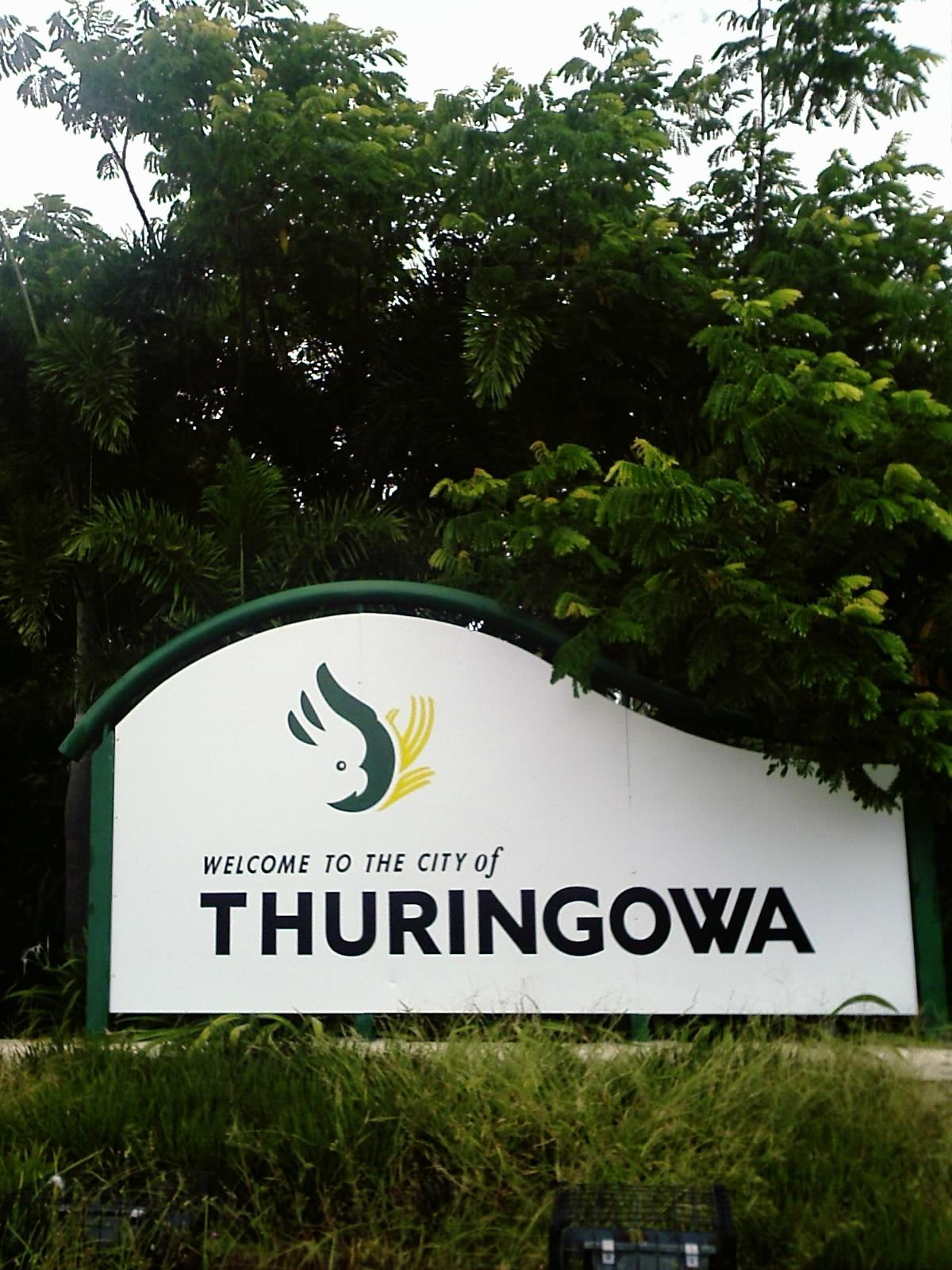

- Coordinates: 19.3138°S 146.7252°E
- Population: 1,953 (2021 census)
  - Density: 1,028/km^{2} (2,660/sq mi)
- Postcode(s): 4817
- Area: 1.9 km^{2} (0.7 sq mi)
- Time zone: AEST (UTC+10:00)
- Location: 12.8 km (8 mi) SE of Townsville CBD; 1,338 km (831 mi) NNW of Brisbane
- LGA(s): City of Townsville
- State electorate(s): Thuringowa
- Federal division(s): Herbert
Suburbs around Thuringowa Central:
Kirwan	Kirwan	Kirwan
Kirwan	Thuringowa Central	Kirwan
Condon	Douglas	Douglas

Thuringowa Central is a suburb of Townsville in the City of Townsville, Queensland, Australia. In the 2021 census, Thuringowa Central had a population of 1,953 people.

== Geography ==
Shaped like an inverted letter "T", Thuringowa Central consists of residential housing in the north, commercial building in the centre and south-west, and recreational areas along the Ross River in the south-east.

Ross River Road runs through from east to west, and Garbutt–Upper Ross Road runs along part of the eastern boundary.

== History ==
Ross River Provisional School opened on 11 April 1881 but closed soon after. It reopened on 26 January 1885. On 1 January it became Ross River State School. Circa 1935 tt was renamed Weir State School.

Thuringowa Central was the central business district of the former City of Thuringowa before its amalgamation with the adjacent City of Townsville in 2008.

When Thuringowa was a city most visitors did not know the location of the city's centre, so in 2004 the Thuringowa city Mayor developed the city centre masterplan to complement the Riverway project.

The Thuringowa Central library opened in 1986 and underwent a major refurbishment in 2016.

== Demographics ==
In the 2016 census, Thuringowa Central had a population of 2,023 people.

In the 2021 census, Thuringowa Central had a population of 1,953 people.

== Education ==
Weir State School is a government primary (Prep–6) school for boys and girls at 592 Ross River Road (19.3152°S 146.7345°E). In 2018, the school had an enrolment of 706 students with 52 teachers (51 full-time equivalent) and 33 non-teaching staff (23 full-time equivalent). It includes a special education program.

The suburb is also served by The Willows State School to the north-west in neighbouring Kirwan and Kirwan State School to the north, also in Kirwan.

There is no secondary school in Thuringowa Central. The nearest government secondary school is Kirwan State High School to the north-east in Kirwan.

== Facilities ==
Despite the name, Kirwan Police Station is at 76 Thuringowa Drive in Thuringowa Central (19.3099°S 146.7307°E). Kirwan Fire Station is immediately adjacent at 84 Thuringowa Drive (19.3095°S 146.7313°E). Kirwan Ambulance Station is around the corner at 5 Hinchinbrook Drive (19.3091°S 146.7308°E).

Also despite its name, Kirwan Health Campus is at 138–158 Thuringowa Drive (19.3042°S 146.7320°E). It provides a range of services including specialist medical clinics, an aged care centre, a brain injury care centre, and an adolescent mental health unit offering inpatient and day care.

== Amenities ==
The Willows Shopping Centre is a major retail centre bounded by Carthew Street to the north, Thuringowa Drive to the east, Hervey Range Road to the south, and Kern Brothers Drive to the west (19.3160°S 146.7266°E). Thuringowa Central Post Shop is in the Willows Shopping Centre (19.3153°S 146.7272°E).

Sunland Plaza is a shopping centre at 14 Hervey Range Roaa (19.3192°S 146.7271°E).

One of the two Townsville Council Chambers, Thuringowa Soundshell, and Reading Cinemas are located in this suburb.

Thuringowa Central is the headquarters for CityLibraries Townsville and is situated at 86 Thuringowa Drive (19.3085°S 146.7313°E). Services offered include community meeting rooms and free public wifi. Access to the Library collections, services and events can be found on the CityLibraries Townsville website.

Pinnacles Art Gallery is within the Riverway Arts Centre at 20 Village Boulevard (19.3082°S 146.7317°E). It is operated by the Townsville City Council and features works by North Queensland artists and touring exhibitions.

Kirwan Uniting Church is at 18 Hinchinbrook Drive (19.3079°S 146.7304°E). It is part of the North Queensland Presbytery of the Uniting Church in Australia.

Willows Presbyterian Church is at 26 Carthew Street (19.3135°S 146.7267°E).
