= Goulburn School Strike =

1962 protest in Goulburn, New South Wales, Australia

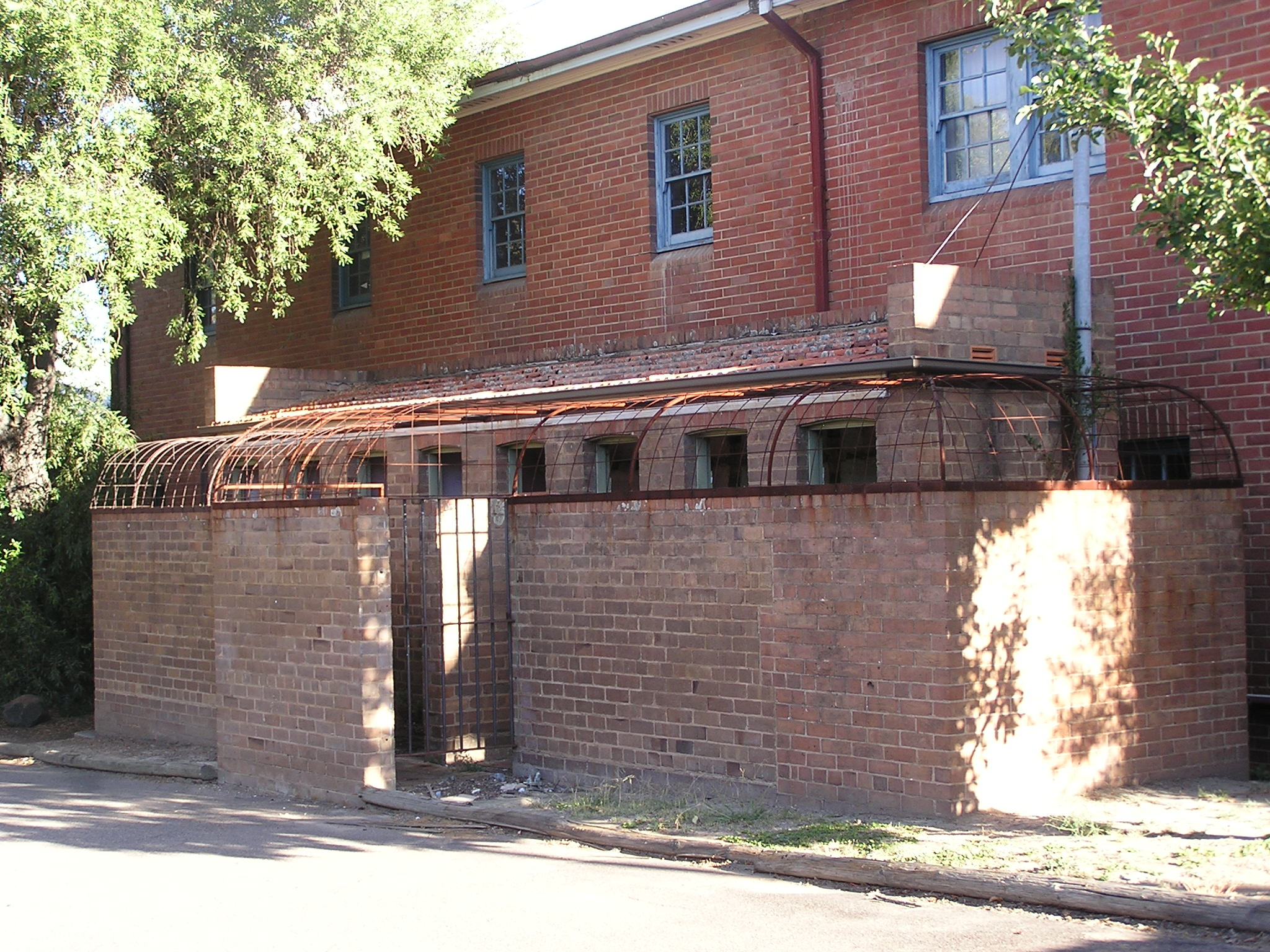
The toilet block at St Brigid's Primary School, Goulburn

The Goulburn School Strike was a protest action in July 1962 in Goulburn, New South Wales, Australia.

The protesters were families of students attending St Brigid's Primary School - as a school run by the local Catholic church. Children enrolled at the school were all withdrawn and enrolled at local state schools in the town, placing pressure on the resources available at those schools. The immediate aim of the protest was to secure government assistance to construct a new toilet block at St Brigid's to meet government health requirements. The protests arose in a background of heated political debate about "state aid" to Catholic schools and accusations of sectarianism. The strike, in effect a lockout, generated hostility in Goulburn and across Australia.

The action and the political aftermath saw both major parties in Australia commit to providing support to Catholic and other religious schools on a "needs" basis, a step away from the earlier philosophy of "free, secular and compulsory". The "state aid" model has persisted, despite some moves for reform, since that date.

== Background ==
Catholic education in Australia started in the early 19th century and by 1833 there were at least 10 Catholic schools operating in Australia. These schools were funded by a mix of charity, fees and, until the 1860s, some government support.

By the 1850s there was strong pressure from the community in each of the Australian colonies for education to be placed on "free, secular and compulsory" basis. The first colony to provide public education was Victoria (Australia) with the passing of the Education Act in 1872. As well as providing for public education, the Act removed government funding for non-government schools, including Catholic schools. By 1893, all of the Australian colonies had legislated to remove government funding from Catholic schools. After the introduction of free, secular education, the Catholic hierarchy and laypeople decided to continue to offer Catholic education. With no funding, Catholic schools relied on religious brothers and sisters for teachers.

Most Catholics in Australia were of Irish background and relations between those Australians of Irish Catholic descent and the mainly Protestant establishment were often fraught. Sectarianism in Australia made the subject of state aid for Catholic schools too politically risky for governments and the Catholic hierarchy to entertain until the middle of the 20th century.

After the Second World War, an increase in student numbers and a decline in religious brothers and sisters saw many Catholic schools in crisis. Classes with over 70 students were held in inadequate facilities. With direct state aid to Catholic schools not permitted, both state and federal governments provided some limited assistance mainly in the way of bursaries paid direct to families and in teacher training. Direct aid to schools for teacher salaries or facilities was unacceptable.

== Lead up ==
Goulburn had a large and growing Catholic population and this was placing pressure on the Catholic schools in the town. The crisis came to a head in 1962 at St Brigid's Primary School which by this time had 84 students in one kindergarten classroom. Inspectors from the New South Wales Department of Education determined that in order to continue to operate, the school needed to install three additional toilets, to cater for the number of children enrolled. The school and the families of the children enrolled claimed to be unable to afford the cost of the additional toilets and with the support of the Auxiliary Bishop of the Archdiocese of Canberra-Goulburn John Cullinane decided to take a stand on the matter.

In a speech on Saint Patrick's Day (17 March) of 1962, Bishop Cullinane stated, in front of Laurie Tully–the local Member of Parliament and government member–that St Brigid's may need to close. The local Catholics were refused a meeting with Ernest Wetherell, the New South Wales Minister for Education, to discuss the matter. The NSW government was advised that if it wished the school to stay open it could pay to have its requirements met. Local parents, paying taxes to support education, supported the Bishop's stand. Bishop Cullinane then invited the minister to a public meeting in Goulburn to debate the matter. While the minister did not attend, 700 locals did and voted 500 to 120 to close not just St Brigid's but all six Catholic schools in Goulburn; the 2000 students of those schools were to be instructed to seek enrolment at government schools.

== Strike ==
The strike formally started on Monday, 16 July 1962 and was scheduled to last for six weeks. On that day, 2,000 children previously educated in Catholic schools in Goulburn presented themselves to government schools for enrolment. Of these 2,000, there was only room for around 640 to be enrolled. The enrolment process itself was smooth with both Catholic families and government schools acting in a spirit of mutual courtesy. The remainder were unable to be accommodated and did not attend school at all. Many of the children who were lucky enough to be enrolled at a government school (there was a random draw for the available places) saw the change of schools as an adventure, while the government school teachers did their best to meet their needs. Jack Plews, an English teacher at Goulburn High School stated "I said I wanted them to enjoy their stay with us no matter how long it was, and we'd do our best to meet their needs in education. And I said, 'For both of us, I hope it will be a learning experience."

While the enrolment process was conducted in a courteous manner, the strike itself saw deep divides in the Goulburn community, both between Catholics and Protestants and between members of the Catholic community with differing views about the strike. One Catholic child remembered being struck in the face by a student at her new school, the assailant remarking, "I hate Catholics".

Initial media coverage was hostile and led to threats against local organisers. Brian Keating, one of the organisers stated, "The members of the steering committee, Jack Mullen and Arthur Rolfe and myself began to get threats, and they were real threats. They were threats to our lives. We were told that if we didn't stop this rot, this strike, we'd stop a bullet."

The tone of coverage changed once the strain on local government schools became apparent. The fear of similar strike action or even the collapse of the Catholic system altogether led to calls that "something must be done". A local Catholic priest explained to the media, "We have tried for 80 years, by speech and talk, to influence them. And we hope that having failed in that way, that this action in Goulburn will help the people to see what we feel is a just claim and an evident one."

Catholic parents were nervous about the impact of the strike on their children's education, both before and during the strike. Before the strike one parent stated, "she would march on Parliament House rather than sacrifice her children - put them in the firing line, so to speak." After a week, with the point made, this concern saw the strike action called off and the Catholic schools re-opened. Some of the enrolled children remained at their state schools after the strike.

== Legacy ==
The action did not see immediate results for the participants. The Australian Labor Party (ALP) Premier of New South Wales, Bob Heffron, was loath to be seen to be forced into a decision but announced he was willing to listen to the concerns of the Church. Church leaders sought state aid for items such as scholarships, teacher training and salaries and capital funding for modern facilities such as science laboratories. The Australian Labor Party was "[thrown] into crisis" with the NSW branch seeking to respond to community concerns while the Federal branch, led by Joe Chamberlain were firm in standing by party policy opposing state aid.

Seeking to exploit this split, in 1963, the Liberal Party of Australia Prime Minister Robert Menzies (a Protestant) announced a new policy committing to federal funding of science laboratories for all schools, government and non-government, and called an early election on this platform. The 1963 election was a success for Menzies who increased his margin by 10 seats, winning an additional seven seats in New South Wales. This result has been at least in part ascribed to Catholic voters leaving their traditional support for the ALP. Later Prime Minister John Howard said of the result "what really happened is that we got Menzies’ Catholics in 1963 for the first time in a really big way. This result saw both parties begin to move in the direction of state aid. While some in the ALP bitterly opposed the concept, the pragmatic Gough Whitlam managed to lead his party to a compromise position where aid would be provided to schools on the basis of need.

In response to this trend, a pressure group — Defence of Government Schools (DOGS) — was formed in 1966 to oppose funding to private religious schools. in 1981 DOGS brought forward a case in the High Court of Australia —Attorney-General (Vic) (Ex rel Black) v Commonwealth— seeking to have state aid for religious schools deemed unconstitutional under Section 116 of the Constitution of Australia. The case was lost with the High Court taking a narrow reading of the s116 prohibition.

The question of state aid for religious schools is still controversial today. In 2010 the Federal Government under Prime Minister Julia Gillard commissioned David Gonski to report on education funding in Australia—the "Gonski Report". The Gonski Report identified a range of reforms to school funding with the aim of making the funding program more transparent. The implementation of these reforms has required negotiations and compromises with the Catholic school system.

St Brigid's Primary School closed in 1976. As of 2012 the school buildings including the toilet block still stood.
