= Lumholtz, Queensland =

Lumholtz
- Suburb
- Interactive map of Lumholtz
- Coordinates: 18.2911°S 145.8980°E
- Country: Australia
- State: Queensland
- LGA: Cassowary Coast Region
- Location: 48.4 km (30.1 mi) NW of Ingham; 159 km (99 mi) NW of Townsville; 196 km (122 mi) SSW of Innisfail; 1,600 km (990 mi) NNW of Brisbane

Government
  - State electorate: Hinchinbrook
  - Federal division: Kennedy

Area
  - Total: 432.6 km^{2} (167.0 sq mi)

Population
  - Total: 0 (2021 census)
  - Density: 0.0000/km^{2} (0.0000/sq mi)
- Time zone: UTC+10:00 (AEST)
- Postcode: 4849
Suburbs around Lumholtz
Kirrama	Murray Upper	Kennedy; Carruchan; Cardwell
Kirrama	Lumholtz	Cardwell; Damper Creek
Wairuna	Abergowrie	Dalrymple Creek

Lumholtz is a rural locality in the Cassowary Coast Region, Queensland, Australia. In the 2021 census, Lumholtz had "no people or a very low population".

== Geography ==
The terrain is mountainous with a number of named peaks (from north to south):

- Mount Alma (18.1901°S 145.8483°E) 861 metres (2,825 ft)
- Mount Pershouse (18.2236°S 145.7955°E) 976 metres (3,202 ft)
- Mount Thorn (18.2703°S 145.8041°E) 926 metres (3,038 ft)
- Mount Creagh (18.2724°S 145.8526°E) 861 metres (2,825 ft)
- Mount Macalister (18.3001°S 145.9416°E) 1,058 metres (3,471 ft)
- Mount Arthur Scott (18.3894°S 146.0464°E) 914 metres (2,999 ft)
- Tabletop Mountain (18.4044°S 145.8214°E) 672 metres (2,205 ft)

Almost all of the locality is within the Girringun National Park, which was originally named Lumholtz National Park when it was created in 1991. The exception is the 594-hectare (1,470-acre) pastoral property Gowrie & Rosevale in the south of the locality (18.3777°S 145.8548°E), where the land use is grazing on native vegetation.

== History ==
The locality is believed to have taken its name from Carl Sofus Lumholtz, a Norwegian traveller and anthropologist, who spent his time working in south and northeast Australia as an ethnographer and field researcher during the 1880s.

== Demographics ==
In the 2016 census, Lumholtz had "no people or a very low population".

In the 2021 census, Lumholtz had "no people or a very low population".

== Education ==
The nearest government primary school is Abergowrie State School in neighbouring Abergowrie to the south. The nearest government secondary school is Ingham State High School in Ingham to the south-east.

== Attractions ==
Tuckers Lookout is a lookout on Kirama Road (18.20438°S 145.83677°E).

Hinkler Falls is a waterfall on an unnamed creek (18.2411°S 145.8433°E).
