= Dalrymple Creek, Queensland =

Dalrymple Creek
- Suburb
- Interactive map of Dalrymple Creek
- Coordinates: 18.4961°S 146.0727°E
- Country: Australia
- State: Queensland
- LGA: Shire of Hinchinbrook
- Location: 16.5 km (10.3 mi) E of Abergowrie; 28.3 km (17.6 mi) NNW of Ingham; 140 km (87 mi) NW of Townsville; 1,501 km (933 mi) NNW of Brisbane

Government
  - State electorate: Hinchinbrook
  - Federal division: Kennedy

Area
  - Total: 112.3 km^{2} (43.4 sq mi)

Population
  - Total: 51 (2021 census)
  - Density: 0.454/km^{2} (1.176/sq mi)
- Time zone: UTC+10:00 (AEST)
- Postcode: 4850
Suburbs around Dalrymple Creek
Abergowrie	Lumholtz	Damper Creek
Abergowrie	Dalrymple Creek	Rungoo
Long Pocket	Lannercost	Hawkins Creek

Dalrymple Creek is a rural locality in the Shire of Hinchinbrook, Queensland, Australia. In the 2021 census, Dalrymple Creek had a population of 51 people.

== Geography ==
The Herbert River forms the south-western boundary of the locality and most of the developed land is on the river flats and predominantly used for growing sugarcane. The rest of the locality is mountainous and mostly undeveloped except for a section within the Abergowrie State Forest.

Mount Cadillah is a named peak in the west of the locality (18.4819°S 146.0275°E).

== History ==
The locality takes its name from the Dalrymple Creek which flows through the locality, a tributary of the Herbert River. The creek in named was named after George Elphinstone Dalrymple, an explorer, public servant and politician.

== Demographics ==
In the 2016 census, Dalrymple Creek had a population of 97 people, 48% female and 52% male. The median age of the population was 46 years, 8 years above the national median of 38.

In the 2021 census, Dalrymple Creek had a population of 51 people, 49% female and 51% male. The median age of the population was 54 years, 16 years above the national median of 38.

== Education ==
There are no schools in Dalrymple Creek. The nearest government primary schools are Abergowrie State School in neighbouring Abergowrie to the west and Ingham State School in Ingham to the south. The nearest government secondary school is Ingham State High School, also in Ingham.
