= Cyclone Owen =

2018 Australian region tropical cyclone

Severe Tropical Cyclone Owen
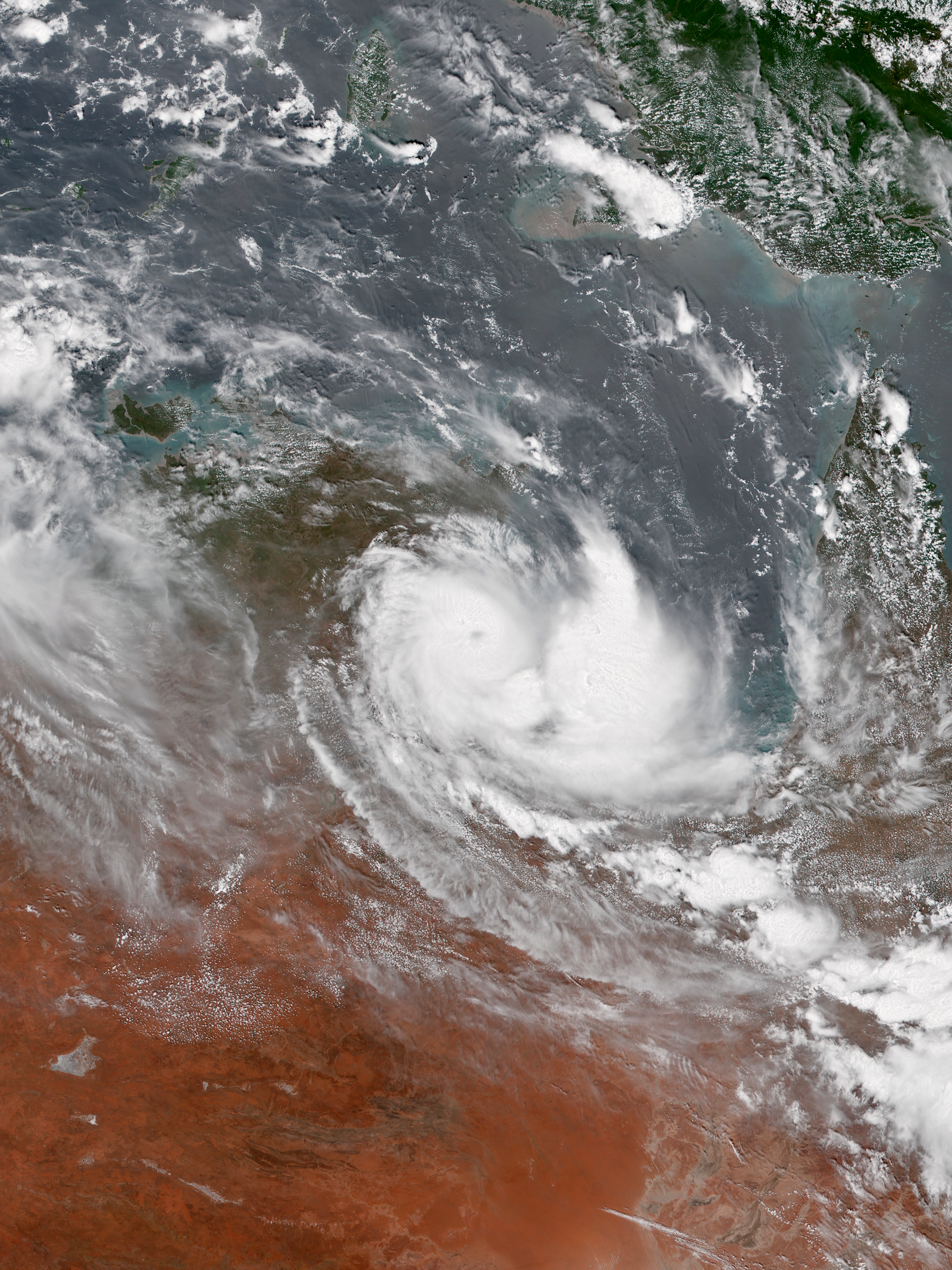
- Owen on 13 December around 03:00 UTC at peak intensity

Meteorological history
- Formed: 29 November 2018
- Dissipated: 20 December 2018

Category 3 severe tropical cyclone
- 10-minute sustained (BOM)
- Highest winds: 150 km/h (90 mph)
- Highest gusts: 205 km/h (125 mph)
- Lowest pressure: 958 hPa (mbar); 28.29 inHg

Category 2-equivalent tropical cyclone
- 1-minute sustained (SSHWS/JTWC)
- Highest winds: 155 km/h (100 mph)
- Lowest pressure: 965 hPa (mbar); 28.50 inHg

Overall effects
- Fatalities: 1
- Damage: $25 million (2018 USD)
- Areas affected: Solomon Islands, Papua New Guinea, Queensland, Northern Territory
- IBTrACS /
- Part of the 2018–19 Australian region cyclone season

Severe Tropical Cyclone Owen was an erratic and very long-lived tropical cyclone that affected numerous regions along its track, especially Queensland, in December 2018. Owen was the fourth tropical low, first tropical cyclone, and first severe tropical cyclone of the 2018–19 Australian region cyclone season. Cyclone Owen developed on 29 November 2018 from an area of low pressure that was situated over the Solomon Islands; the system struggled to strengthen in a conflicting environment and degenerated to a tropical low on 3 December. The low drifted westward, and on 9 December, it made its first landfall in Queensland, before moving over the Gulf of Carpentaria, where more favourable conditions allowed it to re-organise. The system regenerated into a tropical cyclone on 12 December and rapidly intensified into a Category 3 severe tropical cyclone that night. At midnight on 13 December, Cyclone Owen made landfall in the Northern Territory, before turning eastward and reaching peak intensity, with sustained winds of 150 km/h (95 mph) and a minimum barometric pressure of 958 hPa (28.3 inHg). On 13 December, Owen made landfall on Queensland again, just north of the mouth of the Gilbert River near Kowanyama. The cyclone weakened rapidly after its third landfall, and the final advisory on Owen was issued on 15 December, after it had degenerated into a tropical low. However, the system persisted over the Coral Sea for another several days, before dissipating on 20 December.

High winds and flooding from Owen caused significant damage along Papua New Guinea's southern coastline. Owen also caused significant rainfall and flooding upon making its first landfall in Queensland. Flooded creeks overwhelmed the Queensland Heritage Register-listed stone bridge, and wind gusts brought down trees in Yarrabah. Owen's effects as a severe tropical cyclone were mostly minor; the Northern Territory received only wind gusts and heavy rain, while some roads in remote areas were cut off, and 2,400 residents in Queensland lost electricity. Effects on inhabited areas around Kowanyama were limited, because Owen made landfall in an uninhabited area and had a small eyewall, which was too small to be distinguished from visible satellite imagery.

Flooding from rainfall was the most severe impact of Owen. After making landfall and crossing the Cape York Peninsula for the final time, Owen brought heavy rainfall to Australia that caused massive flash flooding; Halifax, Queensland received 681 mm (26.8 in) of rain. A mother and her daughter had to be rescued from crocodile-infested floodwaters; a man was swept to death by floods; and a tourist had to be rescued from dangerous ocean swells triggered by the cyclone. Additionally, flooding cut the Bruce Highway north of Ingham. The flooding also had significant effects on the agriculture of North Queensland; around 281 chickens were lost, and sugarcane crops were heavily impacted. The economic impact was estimated to be around AU$32.5 million (US$25 million).

== Meteorological history ==
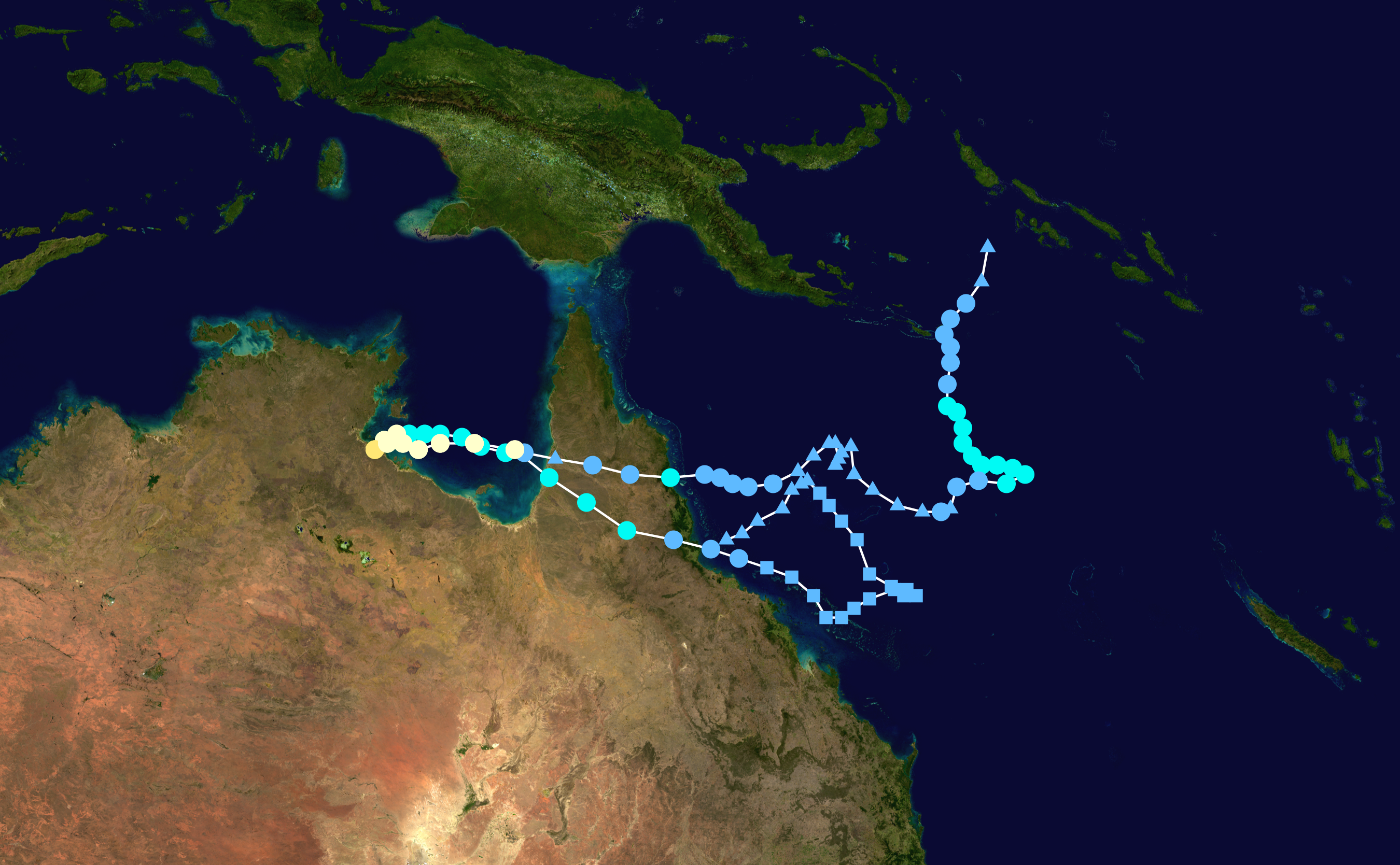
Map plotting the storm's track and intensity, according to the Saffir–Simpson scale Map key Saffir–Simpson scale Tropical depression (≤38 mph, ≤62 km/h) Tropical storm (39–73 mph, 63–118 km/h) Category 1 (74–95 mph, 119–153 km/h) Category 2 (96–110 mph, 154–177 km/h) Category 3 (111–129 mph, 178–208 km/h) Category 4 (130–156 mph, 209–251 km/h) Category 5 (≥157 mph, ≥252 km/h) Unknown Storm type Tropical cyclone Subtropical cyclone Extratropical cyclone, remnant low, tropical disturbance, or monsoon depression

On 28 November, the United States' Joint Typhoon Warning Center (JTWC) first noted an area of low pressure that was located in the Solomon Sea, about 645 km (400 mi) to the north of Honiara in the Solomon Islands. The disturbance had a very disorganised low-level circulation, with atmospheric convection displaced to the south-west of the circulation. The system was also located within a very favourable environment for further development, with low levels of vertical wind shear, excellent outflow and sea surface temperatures of around 30–32 °C (86–90 °F). Over the next day, the system's low-level circulation slowly consolidated as it moved south-westward. On 28 November, the Australian Bureau of Meteorology (BoM) classified the system as Tropical Low 04U. Over the next few days, the system moved southward over the Solomon Sea and into the Coral Sea, under the influence of a ridge of high pressure, and gradually developed, with atmospheric convection consolidating near the storm's centre. On 2 December, the JTWC initiated advisories on the system and designated it as "Tropical Cyclone 05P". The system subsequently reached Category 1 tropical cyclone status on the Australian Scale and was named Owen by the BoM.

Soon after being named, despite continued favourable conditions, Owen's surrounding convective structure began to weaken. Three hours later, the system encountered marginally-conductive conditions, and the storm struggled to maintain deep convection and appeared asymmetrical, especially due to increasing westerly wind shear. Despite marginal conditions, a burgeoning central dense overcast (CDO) formed over the low-level circulation centre, and the system became more symmetrical and began intensifying early on 3 December. That morning, Owen's convection began to wrap around its low-level circulation centre, leading to a burst of convection and the development of an irregular CDO. Despite the cyclone maintaining good organisation, conditions became less favourable by noon on 3 December, and Owen struggled to maintain its convection. As the day progressed, most of the system's convection was displaced to the southeast, and the system started to become increasingly disorganised, due to an increase in wind shear; by nightfall, Owen had begun weakening. On the next day, Owen's low level circulation centre was partially-exposed and elongated, and the BoM reported that the system had weakened into a tropical low, as its low-level circulation centre had become displaced to the west of its atmospheric convection. The JTWC followed suit eleven hours later.

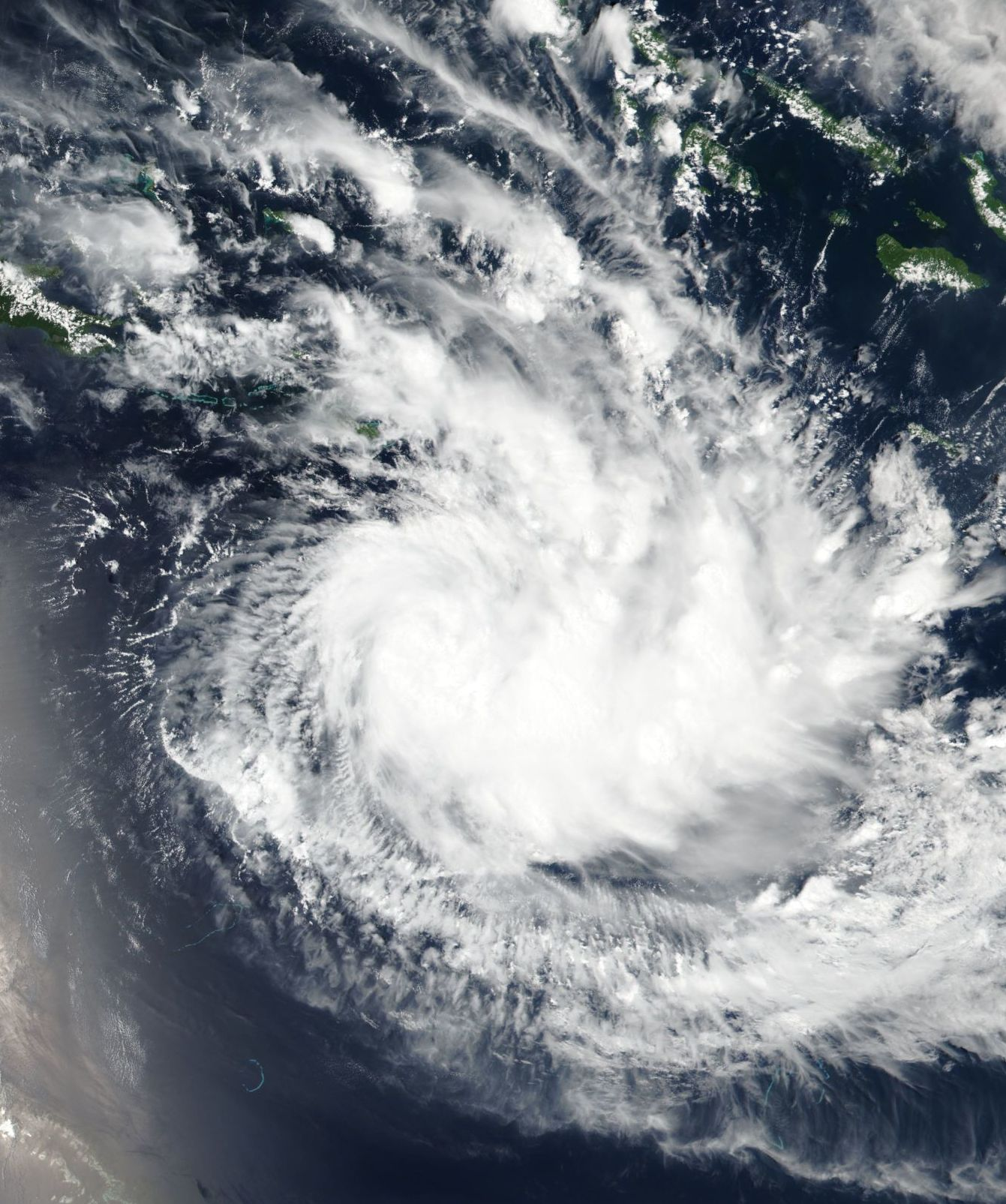
The newly named Cyclone Owen, south of the Solomon Islands, at around 03:30 UTC on 2 December

Over the next six days, Tropical Low Owen moved westward, towards Queensland. Around 18:00 UTC on 9 December (04:00 AEST, 10 December), the tropical low made landfall within vicinity of Port Douglas on Queensland's Cape York Peninsula; however, the JTWC's best track suggested that the system became a Category 1-equivalent tropical cyclone for a short period before making landfall. The system continued moving westward and emerged over the Gulf of Carpentaria at about 14:00 UTC on 10 December (00:00 AEST, 11 December). Through 11 December, Owen remained at about the same intensity as it continued to move westward. By 12 December, Owen was slowly moving westward over the Gulf of Carpentaria.

Early on 12 December, conditions for cyclogenesis started to become more favourable, with sea surface temperatures reaching 31 °C (88 °F), allowing convection to increase. At about 12:00 UTC on 12 December (22:00 AEST, 12 December), Owen regenerated into a Category 1 tropical cyclone. However, according to the JTWC, Owen had regenerated into a tropical cyclone earlier, at around 15:00 UTC on 11 December (01:00 AEST, 12 December), nearly one day earlier than the BoM's estimate. According to the JTWC, Owen quickly intensified between that advisory and its subsequent official reformation. Just over two hours after Owen was re-designated as a tropical cyclone by the BoM, the storm had already strengthened close to hurricane strength by 1-minute sustained wind speeds (according to estimates using the Dvorak technique), according to the JTWC.

Owen rapidly intensified overnight, from 12 to 13 December, into a low-end Category 3 severe tropical cyclone, while its outer bands hit areas of Queensland and Northern Territory. Simultaneously, Owen reached Category 1 hurricane-equivalent intensity in 1-minute sustained winds, on the Saffir–Simpson hurricane wind scale (SSWHS). The system made landfall in the Northern Territory at about 00:00 UTC on 13 December, as a Category severe 3 cyclone, north-west of the Port McArthur Tidal Wetlands System, which was not inhabited. Despite making landfall, Owen continued intensifying, and the storm developed an eye for the first time six hours later. Shortly afterward, Owen reached its 1-minute sustained wind peak, of around 155 km/h (95 mph) in 1-minute sustained winds, which was equivalent to Category 2 hurricane intensity on the Saffir–Simpson scale. By noon, Owen had reached its peak intensity of 150 km/h (95 mph), at 12:00 UTC that day, and emerged over back over water shortly afterward. Over the next few hours, the storm turned more eastwards and approached Queensland, while maintaining Category 3 tropical cyclone intensity, as it was steered by an amplifying trough, and its eye began to turn ragged. As Owen neared landfall under the influence of an upper-level low, the system's low-level circulation centre became less-defined. Despite this, Owen's 1-minute sustained wind intensity remained the same during its time over the Gulf of Carpentaria, until the storm started weakening slightly, shortly before landfall.

At around 17:00 UTC on 14 December, Owen made landfall as a Category 3 severe tropical cyclone at the mouth of the Gilbert River, about 85 km (55 mi) south-west of Kowanyama, Queensland. While over Queensland, the cyclone weakened below hurricane-equivalent intensity by 1-minute sustained wind intensity. By the next day, the storm lost convection and rapidly weakened into a weak Category 1 tropical cyclone on the Australian region scale, but there was a persistent, small, and warming CDO maintained by the cyclone. At 06:00 UTC on 15 December, the BoM released its last bulletin on Owen, as the system degenerated into a remnant-low. Shortly afterward, at 09:00 UTC on the same day, the JTWC followed suit and released its own last advisory on the ex-cyclone, as it barely held onto tropical storm intensity, and its shallow bands of convection fragmented. Owen emerged into the Coral Sea as a tropical low late on 15 December, and transitioned into a subtropical low the next day. The system was last noted by the BoM during 20 December, while it was located about 410 km (255 mi) to the northeast of Townsville, Queensland.

== Effects ==
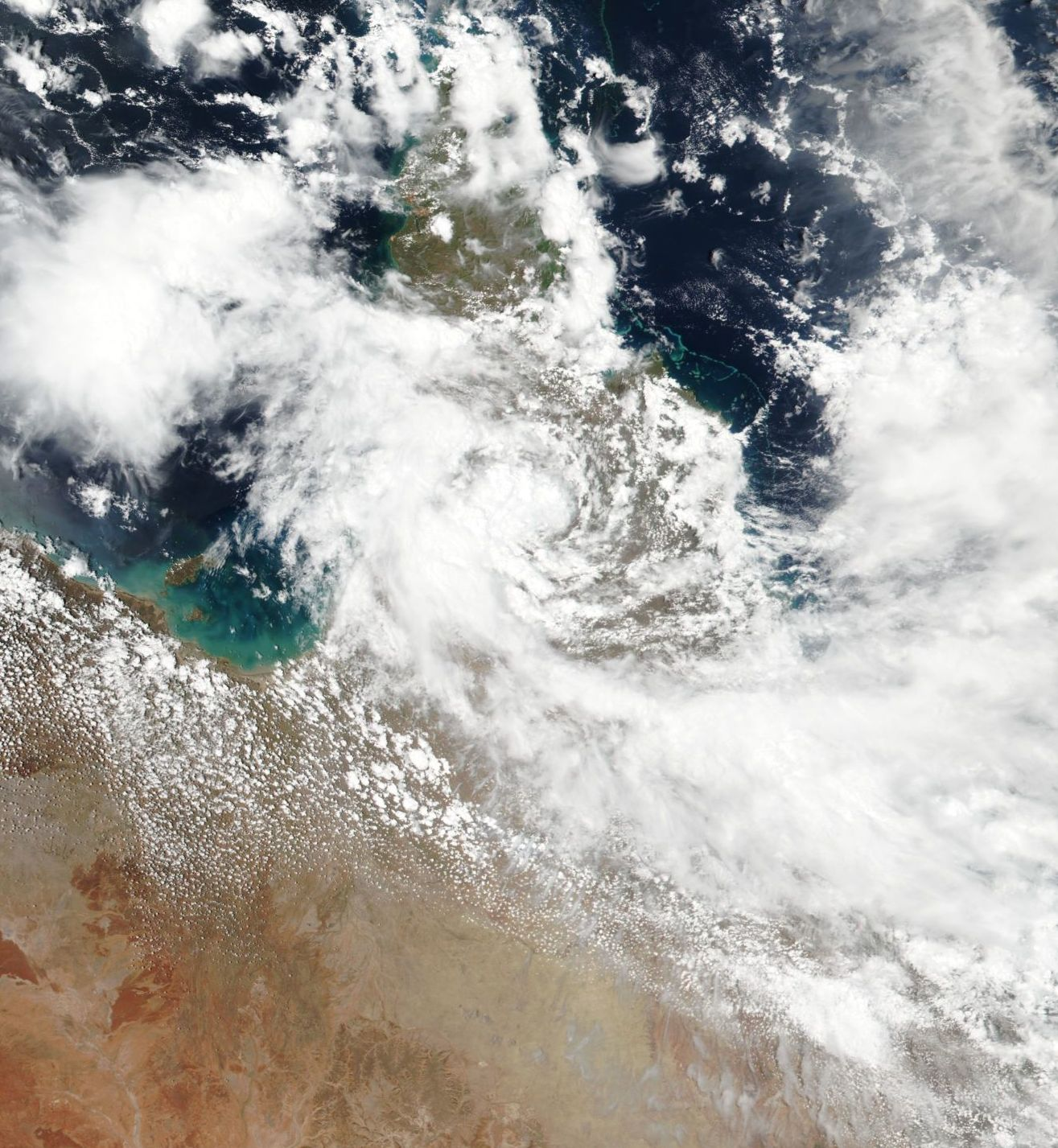
Cyclone Owen, as an ex-tropical low, making landfall in Queensland at 04:20 UTC on 10 December

In a report that was sent to World Meteorological Organization, Papua New Guinea's National Weather Service stated that wind gusts and flooding from the cyclone had caused significant damage across the country's southern coastline.

Leading up to the system's first landfall, Owen caused heavy rainfall at Kirrama Range, Flaggy Creek and Caldwell Tide, which received 349, 286 and 278 mm (13.7, 11.3 and 10.9 in) of rain, respectively. Off the Australian coasts, wind gusts of 100 and 93 km/h (62 and 58 mph) were recorded, respectively, at Low Isles and Arlington Reef. Inland, Innisfail Airport and Cairns Airport both recorded up to 87 km/h (54 mph) in gusts. On 10 December, as Cyclone Owen made its first landfall in Queensland as a post-tropical low, it caused creeks to flood the area around Port Douglas and Ingham. About 209 mm (8.2 in) of rain fell in Wallaman, and the historic Stone Bridge at Dalrymple Gap Track was also flooded. Cyclone shelters were opened for the residents of Borroloola and Numbulwar, while residents between Port Roper and Alyangula were urged to take shelter from the cyclone. Authorities rescued three fishermen, whom had sent distress signals near South West Island, Northern Territory, from a boat. Trees were brought down in Yarrabah, east of Cairns.

After crossing the Cape York Peninsula, warnings were issued for residents from Groote Eylandt to Burketown, in preparation for the cyclone. Business owners in Borroloola were warned to check their fuel and stock supplies for possible flash flooding. Eighty council staff members were evacuated from Mornington Island. The Northern Territory suffered only minor damage from Cyclone Owen; gale-force winds and heavy rain were the only recorded impacts.

Authorities issued warnings as Cyclone Owen emerged from land, turned back, and approached Queensland for the second time. In Pormpuraaw, Cape York Peninsula, an Emergency Alert Campaign was issued, asking people to warn their neighbours, secure their belongings and seek safe shelter. Tesla rolled out Storm Watch feature to the homeowners who installed Tesla Powerwall in Australia ahead of cyclone, marking this the first time it was activated outside the United States. On 14 December, Owen's second landfall in Queensland left 2,400 residents without power, and the region was affected by severe thunderstorms and several hailstorms. Most of the damage was localised; Centre Island automatic weather station recorded gale-force wind gusts for three hours, peaking at 91 km/h (57 mph). Several roads in the remote areas were cut by flooding. Residents from Bing Bong and King Ash Bay were evacuated to Borrorrola as they were located in the vicinity of where Cyclone Owen made landfall. Because of Cyclone Owen's tiny eye, which was 20 km (12 miles) across on weather radar (and was too small to be distinguished from visible satellite imagery), indigenous communities and farmers at Kowanyama were spared from the worst effects of the cyclone.

After crossing Queensland, very heavy rainfall was recorded, with rainfall at Halifax reaching 68 mm (2.7 in) on 16 December. This heavy rainfall caused massive flash flooding. These floodwaters were infested with crocodiles; a woman and her daughter narrowly escaped from these waters. A man died after being swept away by floods near a swimming spot in Mutarnee. At Mooloolaba on the Sunshine Coast, a tourist was rescued from ocean swells caused by the cyclone. In Ingham, parts of Bruce Highway was cut off by floodwaters north of the city, while motorists were told to avoid traveling the highway; 281 chickens in a family farm were also lost to flooding. Sugarcane crops within the region were also heavily impacted by the cyclone, as Braemeadows farmers reported more than 700 mm (28 in) of rainfall, while the localities of Paradise Lagoon, Lucinda and Ingham recorded 212 mm (8.3 in), 390 mm (15 in) and 300 mm (12 in) of rainfall, respectively. Lucinda also recorded 100 km/h (62 mph) gusts as well. Overall, Owen was estimated to cause around AU$32.5 million (US$25 million) in losses.

== See also ==
- Tropical cyclones in 2018
- Cyclone Rewa (1993–94) – long-lived tropical cyclone that also affected Australia and the southern Pacific islands
- Cyclone Justin (1997) – a cyclone which took a similar path to Owen
