= St. Teresa's College, Abergowrie =

St Teresa's College, Abergowrie
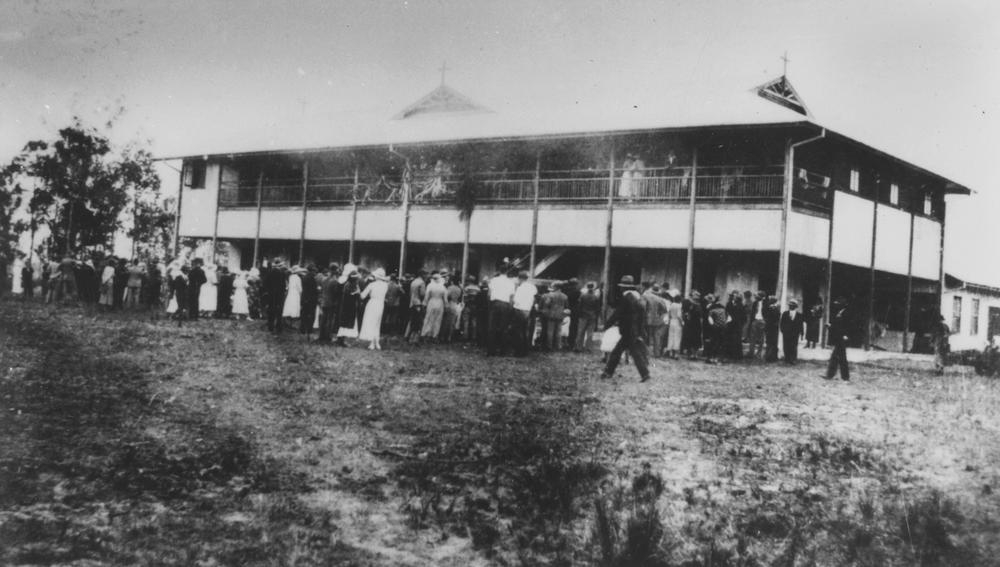
- St Theresa's Agricultural College, c. 1932

Location
- Abergowrie, Ingham, Queensland; Australia
- Coordinates: 18°28′46.46″S 145°54′0.27″E

Information
- Type: Independent secondary day and boarding school
- Motto: Reap What You Sow
- Religious affiliation: Catholicism
- Denomination: Congregation of Christian Brothers
- Established: 1933; 93 years ago
- Oversight: Diocese of Townsville, Catholic Education Office
- Headmaster: Angus Galletly
- Gender: Boys
- Enrolment: 230 (2012)
- Website: www.abergowrie.catholic.edu.au

St Teresa's College, Abergowrie is an independent Catholic secondary day and boarding school for boys, located in Abergowrie, approximately 40 kilometres (25 mi) north west of Ingham, in Far North Queensland, Australia.

The school was established by the Congregation of Christian Brothers in 1933 and was called St Teresa's Agricultural College. Oversight of the school is managed by the Diocese of Townsville Catholic Education Office.

== Overview ==
The college enrols approximately 230 students who come from towns and communities from all across North Queensland as well as from Papua New Guinea. In 2010, St Teresa's College was recognised for its achievements in education being awarded the Deadly Award for the "Most Outstanding Achievement in Education".

The principal is Angus Galletly.

== Notable alumni ==
- Peter Moore, politician
- Palmer Wapau, rugby league player

== Australian Football Team Achievements ==
=== Junior Male (Years 7-9) ===
- AFL North Queensland Schools Cup

(gold) Champions: 2018

== See also ==
- Catholic education in Australia
- Lists of schools in Queensland
- List of Christian Brothers schools
