= Abergowrie, Queensland =

Abergowrie
- Town
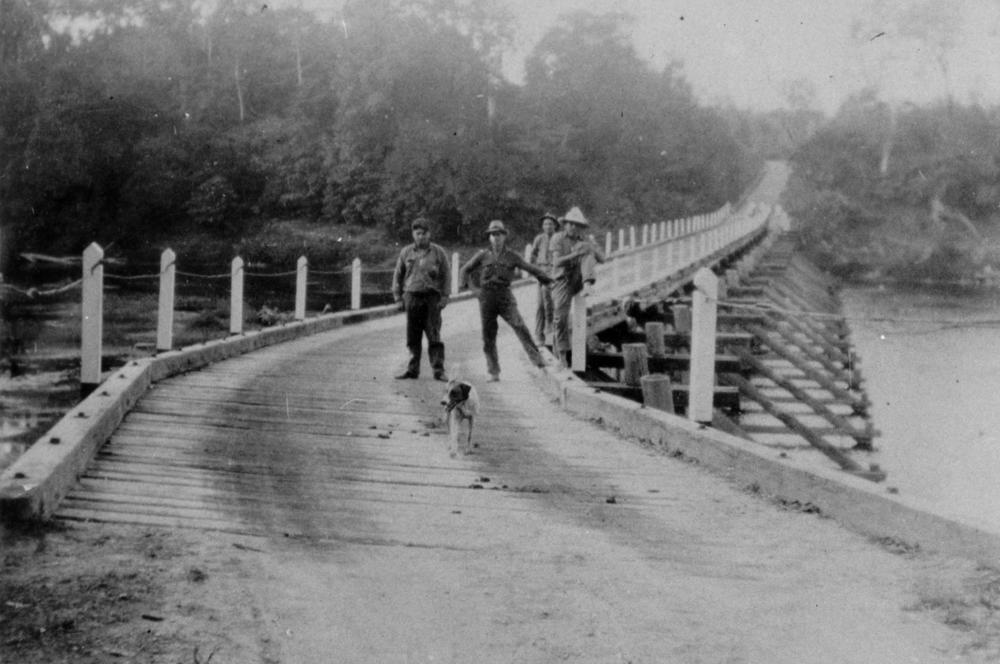
- Abergowrie Bridge over the Herbert River on the road from Ingham to Abergowrie, Queensland, circa 1934

- Interactive map of Abergowrie
- Coordinates: 18.4755°S 145.8861°E
- Country: Australia
- State: Queensland
- LGA: Shire of Hinchinbrook
- Location: 38.4 km (23.9 mi) NW of Ingham; 149 km (93 mi) NW of Townsville; 173 km (107 mi) S of Cairns; 1,497 km (930 mi) NNW of Brisbane

Government
  - State electorate: Hinchinbrook
  - Federal division: Kennedy

Area
  - Total: 306.3 km^{2} (118.3 sq mi)

Population
  - Total: 305 (2021 census)
  - Density: 0.9958/km^{2} (2.579/sq mi)
- Time zone: UTC+10:00 (AEST)
- Postcode: 4850
Localities around Abergowrie
Lumholtz	Lumholtz	Damper Creek
Wairuna	Abergowrie	Dalrymple Creek
Garrawalt	Long Pocket	Dalrymple Creek

Abergowrie is a rural town and locality in the Shire of Hinchinbrook, Queensland, Australia. In the 2021 census, the locality of Abergowrie had a population of 305 people.

== Geography ==
The town is located near the confluence of the Herbert River and Gowrie Creek.

Abergowrie has the following mountains:

- Boulder Hill (18.4535°S 146.0134°E) 145 metres (476 ft)
- Duncan Bluff (18.3972°S 146.0465°E) 977 metres (3,205 ft)
- Mount Cadillah (18.4813°S 146.0268°E) 188 metres (617 ft)
- Mount Echo (18.3931°S 145.7937°E) 622 metres (2,041 ft)
- Mount Graham (18.4027°S 145.8656°E) 834 metres (2,736 ft)
- Mount Westminster Abbey (18.4204°S 146.0434°E) 926 metres (3,038 ft)
- Slopeaway (18.4697°S 146.0201°E) 365 metres (1,198 ft)

== History ==
Gugu Badhun (also known as Koko-Badun and Kokopatun) is an Australian Aboriginal language of North Queensland. The language region includes areas within the local government area of Charters Towers Region, particularly the localities of Greenvale and the Valley of Lagoons, and in the Upper Burdekin River area and in Abergowrie.

The town is named after the Abergowrie property, selected by James Atkinson in 1883. He coined the name from the Celtic word aber (confluence) and gowrie for Gowrie Creek, reflecting the location.

On Sunday 22 October 1933, Bishop McGuire laid the foundation stone for a Catholic agricultural farm school. The site was 690 acres (280 ha) with a frontage to the Herbert River with 12 acres (4.9 ha) of the total to be used for the college buildings. Boys would be able to take a 2-year course that would prepare them to be farmers. In January 1934, Reverend Brother William Benedict Doran was appointed principal of the college; he had trained in agriculture at the Gatton Agricultural College, the Hawkesbury Agricultural College, and the Lismore Agricultural College. The college opened to students on 1 March 1934. St Teresa's Agricultural College was officially opened the Apostolic Delegate, Filippo Bernardini. It was operated by the Christian Brothers. It is now known as St Theresa's College.

Elphinstone Pocket State School opened circa 1936. It closed circa 1945. It was at 2624 Abergowrie Road (18.49692°S 146.00228°E). In 1946, the building was relocated to Trebonne State School in Trebonne.

In 1946, a Royal Commission was established to investigate soldier settlement schemes for soldiers returning from World War II. Abergowrie was chosen as a site where 300 farms could be established with sugarcane being the likely crop. It was also proposed that a sugar mill be established, but instead a cane tramway was built to transport the harvested sugarcane from Abergowrie to the Victoria sugar mill near Ingham.

In January 1953, an 'unofficial' post office was requested. Abergowrie Post Office opened on 1 May 1953 and closed in 1974.

Abergowrie State School opened on 23 February 1953.

== Demographics ==
In the 2016 census, the locality of Abergowrie had a population of 438 people, 31% female and 69% male with 30.8% being Indigenous Australian. The median age of the population was 32 years, 6 years below the national median of 38. 92.5% of people living in Abergowrie were born in Australia. The other top responses for country of birth were Papua New Guinea 1.4%, Italy 1.2% and Fiji 0.7%. 77.9% of people spoke only English at home; the next most common languages were 1.4% Italian, 1.4% Djambarrpuyngu, 0.9% Kuuk Thayorre, 0.9% Kriol and 0.7% Guugu Yimidhirr.

In the 2021 census, the locality of Abergowrie had a population of 305 people, 39.9% female and 60.1% male with 10.5% being Indigenous Australian. The median age of the population was 47 years, 9 years above the national median of 38. 84.6% of people living in Abergowrie were born in Australia. The other top responses for country of birth were Fiji 1.6%, 1.3% South Africa, 1.0% Papua New Guinea and 1.0% Italy. 81.0% of people spoke only English at home; the next most common languages were 2.3% Yumplatok (Torres Strait Creole), 2.0% Spanish, 1.6% Fijian, 1.6% Creole (nfd) and 1.3% Italian.

== Education ==
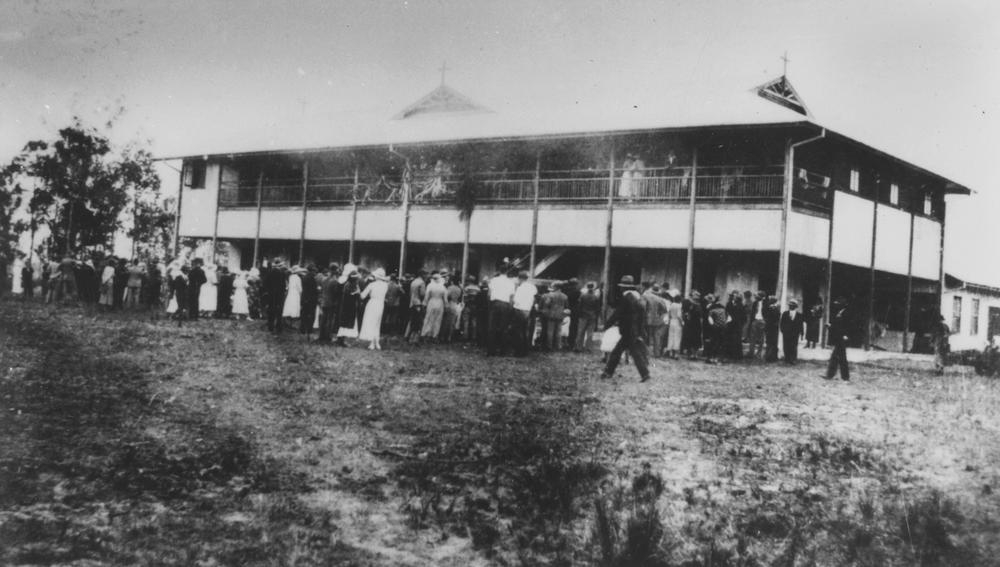
St Theresa's Agricultural College, Abergowrie, Queensland, circa 1932

Abergowrie State School is a government primary (Prep-6) school for boys and girls at 5 Venables Road (18.4746°S 145.8835°E). In 2017, the school had an enrolment of 4 students with 2 teachers (1 full-time equivalent) and 5 non-teaching staff (2 full-time equivalent). In 2018, the school had an enrolment of 8 students with 2 teachers (1 full-time equivalent) and 5 non-teaching staff (2 full-time equivalent).

St Teresa's College is a Catholic secondary (7-12) school for boys at 3819 Abergowrie Road (18.4803°S 145.8995°E). In 2017, the school had an enrolment of 201 students with 36 teachers (34 full-time equivalent) and 31 non-teaching staff (25 full-time equivalent). In 2018, the school had an enrolment of 190 students with 35 teachers (34 full-time equivalent) and 34 non-teaching staff (30 full-time equivalent).

There is no government secondary school in Abergowrie. The nearest government secondary school is Ingham State High School in Ingham to the south-east.

== Community groups ==
The Abergowrie-Long Pocket branch of the Queensland Country Women's Association meets at 2346 Abergowrie Road, Long Pocket (18.5215°S 146.0033°E).
