= Damper Creek, Queensland =

Damper Creek
- Suburb
- Interactive map of Damper Creek
- Coordinates: 18.3697°S 146.1005°E
- Country: Australia
- State: Queensland
- LGA: Cassowary Coast Region
- Location: 45.2 km (28.1 mi) N of Ingham; 52.1 km (32.4 mi) S of Tully; 103 km (64 mi) S of Innisfail; 190 km (120 mi) S of Cairns; 1,505 km (935 mi) NNW of Brisbane

Government
  - State electorate: Hinchinbrook
  - Federal division: Kennedy

Area
  - Total: 164.6 km^{2} (63.6 sq mi)

Population
  - Total: 34 (2021 census)
  - Density: 0.2066/km^{2} (0.535/sq mi)
- Time zone: UTC+10:00 (AEST)
- Postcode: 4849
Suburbs around Damper Creek
Lumholtz	Cardwell	Hinchinbrook Channel
Abergowrie	Damper Creek	Hinchinbrook Channel
Dalrymple Creek	Rungoo	Hinchinbrook Channel

Damper Creek is a coastal locality in the Cassowary Coast Region, Queensland, Australia. In the 2021 census, Damper Creek had a population of 34 people.

== Geography ==
Damper Creek is bounded to the east by the Hinchinbrook Channel which the mainland from the Hinchinbrook Island. The Bruce Highway passes from south to north through the locality. The North Coast railway line also passes from south to north through the locality, roughly parallel and to the east of the highway.

Most of the locality is within the protected areas of Girringun National Park and Cardwell State Forest. The rest of the locality is low-lying coastal land which is relatively undeveloped apart from areas used for aquaculture. In the north-west and south-west corners of the locality, the land rises sharply into the Cardwell Range.

== Demographics ==
In the 2016 census, Damper Creek had a population of 49 people.

In the 2021 census, Damper Creek had a population of 34 people.

== Heritage listings ==
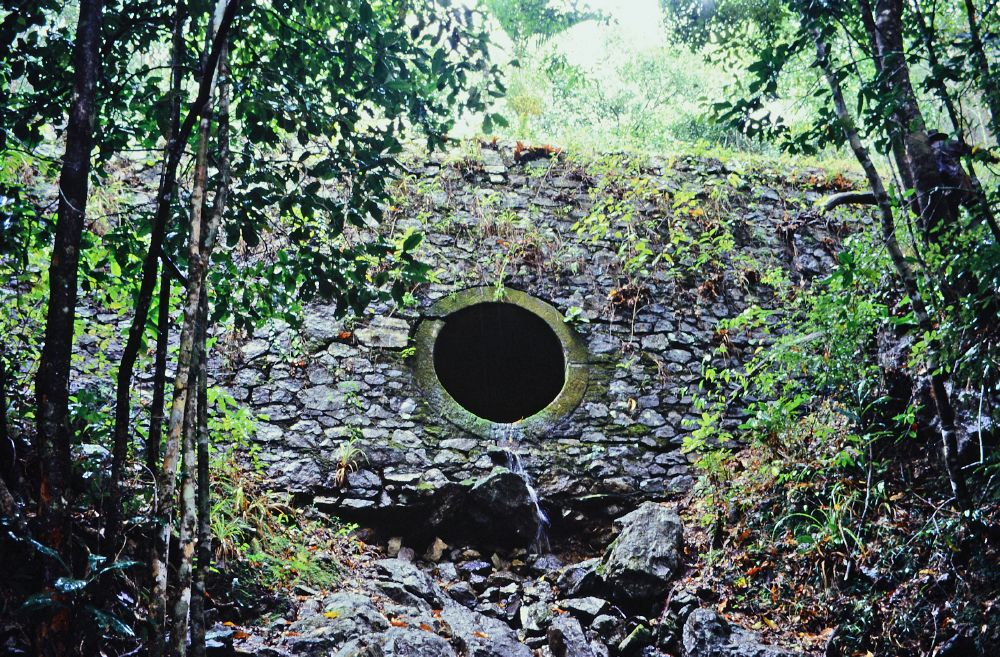
Stone Bridge, Dalrymple Gap Track, 1993

Damper Creek has a number of heritage-listed sites, including:

- Stone Bridge, Dalrymple Gap Track, Valley of Lagoons Road (18.3995°S 146.0787°E)

== Education ==
There are no schools in Damper Creek. The nearest government primary school is Cardwell State School in neighbouring Cardwell to the north. The nearest government secondary schools are Ingham State High School in Ingham to the south and Tully State High School in Tully to the north-west.
