= Section 116 of the Constitution of Australia =

Australian Constitution section regarding religion

Section 116 of the Constitution of Australia precludes the Commonwealth of Australia (i.e., the federal parliament) from making laws for establishing any religion, imposing any religious observance, or prohibiting the free exercise of any religion. Section 116 also provides that no religious test shall be required as a qualification for any office or public trust under the Commonwealth. The product of a compromise in the pre-Federation constitutional conventions, Section 116 is based on similar provisions in the United States Constitution. However, Section 116 is more narrowly drafted than its US counterpart, and does not preclude the states of Australia from making such laws.

Section 116 has been interpreted narrowly by the High Court of Australia: while the definition of "religion" adopted by the court is broad and flexible, the scope of the protection of religions is circumscribed. The result of the court's approach has been that no court has ever ruled a law to be in contravention of Section 116, and the provision has played only a minor role in Australian constitutional history. Among the laws that the High Court has ruled not to be in contravention of Section 116 are laws that provided government funding to religious schools, that authorised the dissolution of a branch of the Jehovah's Witnesses, and that enabled the forcible removal of Indigenous Australian children from their families.

Federal Governments have twice proposed the amendment of Section 116, principally to apply its provisions to laws made by the states. On each occasion—in 1944 and 1988—the proposal failed in a referendum.

== Text of the provision and location in the Constitution ==
Section 116 states:

The Commonwealth shall not make any law for establishing any religion, or for imposing any religious observance, or for prohibiting the free exercise of any religion, and no religious test shall be required as a qualification for any office or public trust under the Commonwealth.

Section 116 has four limbs. The first three limbs prohibit the Commonwealth from making certain laws: laws "for establishing any religion"; laws "for imposing any religious observance"; and laws "for prohibiting the free exercise of any religion". The fourth limb proscribes the imposition of religious tests to qualify for any Commonwealth office or public trust. Only the "establishing religion" and "prohibiting free exercise" limbs have been the subject of cases before the High Court.

The section sits in Chapter V of the Constitution, which deals with the states of Australia. However, Section 116 does not apply to the states. Each state has its own constitution, and only Tasmania's has a provision similar to Section 116. Commentators attribute the erroneous location of Section 116 to a drafting oversight caused by the weariness of the committee charged with finalising the draft Constitution.

== Origins ==
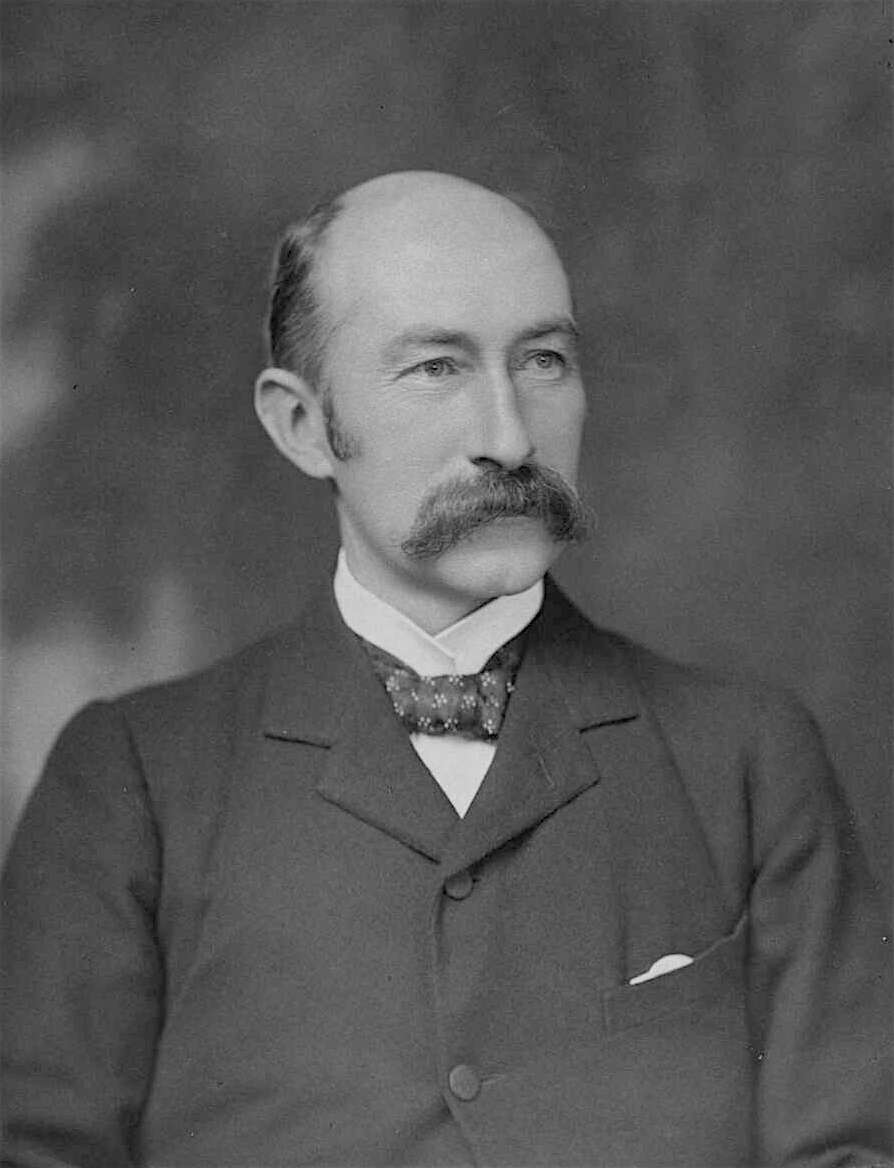
H. B. Higgins, proponent of Section 116 in the pre-Federation constitutional conventions

The Constitution was the product of a series of constitutional conventions in the 1890s. The issues of religious freedom and secularism were not prominent in the convention debates, which focused on the economic and legislative powers of the proposed Commonwealth parliament. The first draft of Section 116, approved by the Melbourne Convention of 1891, would have prohibited the states from passing laws prohibiting the free exercise of religion. The Commonwealth was not mentioned because it was assumed that the Commonwealth parliament would have no power to make such laws. At the Melbourne Convention of 1897, Victorian delegate H. B. Higgins expressed concern about this assumption and moved to expand the provision to cover the Commonwealth as well as the states. The amendment was initially defeated, but Higgins later succeeded in having the eventual version of Section 116 adopted by the convention in a 25–16 vote. Higgins feared opposition to the provision from convention delegates concerned that the provision would impede the states' legislative powers, so the version passed by the convention did not mention the states.

The proposed inclusion of Section 116 in the Constitution was the subject of some dissent in the 1897 Melbourne Convention and the final convention in 1898. Protestant churches in New South Wales argued that the Constitution should state that divine providence is the "ultimate source of law", while convention delegates John Quick and Paddy Glynn moved to have God explicitly recognised in the Constitution. The Seventh-day Adventist Church campaigned for a strict separation of church and state, being concerned that the Commonwealth might prohibit its members from working on Sundays. Both sides to some extent achieved their objectives: Section 116 was approved by the final convention, while Glynn successfully moved for the symbolic mention of "Almighty God" in the preamble to the British statute that was to contain the Constitution. The Constitution was then approved by popular referendums in each of the six colonies and took effect on 1 January 1901 (the colonies thus became the states of Australia).

Section 116 reflects two provisions of the United States Constitution: the First Amendment, which prohibits the making of laws for the establishment of religion and guarantees the free exercise of religion; and Article VI, Section 3, which prohibits the imposition of religious tests for public offices. Academic Clifford L. Pannam, writing in 1963, called Section 116 a "fairly blatant piece of transcription" of its US counterparts. However, in practice, Section 116 has been interpreted more narrowly than the US provisions.

== Judicial consideration ==
The High Court's consideration of Section 116 has generally been limited to three areas: the definition of "religion"; the meaning of "law for establishing any religion"; and the meaning of "law for prohibiting the free exercise of any religion". The two other elements of the provision—the clauses prohibiting the Commonwealth from imposing of religious observance and from prescribing religious tests for public offices—have not been the subject of any cases before the court. The court has never ruled a legislative provision to be in contravention of Section 116. As a result of the court's narrow and literal interpretation of Section 116, the provision has played a minor role in Australian constitutional history.

=== Meaning of "religion" ===
A threshold test considered by courts applying Section 116 is whether a belief seeking constitutional protection is a "religion". The leading authority on the question is the 1983 judgment of the High Court in Church of the New Faith v Commissioner for Pay-Roll Tax (Vic). The court found that Scientology was a religion, despite some justices commenting that its practices were "impenetrably obscure". In reaching this finding, the court argued that the definition of religion needed to be flexible but should recognise the need to be sceptical of disingenous claims of religious practice. Justices Anthony Mason and Gerard Brennan held:

... the criteria of religion [are] twofold: first, belief in a supernatural, Being, Thing or Principle; and second, the acceptance of canons of conduct in order to give effect to that belief.

Justices Ronald Wilson and William Deane were less prescriptive, setting out five "indicia" of a religion: a belief in the supernatural; a belief in ideas relating to "man's nature and place in the universe"; the adherence to particular standards, codes of conduct or practices by those who hold the ideas; the existence of an identifiable group of believers, even if not a formal organisation; and the opinion of the believers that what they believe in constitutes a religion.

=== "Establishing any religion" ===
The courts have taken a narrow approach to the interpretation of the prohibition against "establishing any religion", deriving from the 1981 case of Attorney-General (Vic) (Ex rel Black) v Commonwealth (known as the DOGS case or 'State Aid' Case), in which the High Court held that Commonwealth funding of religious schools did not contravene Section 116. Chief Justice Garfield Barwick held that a law would only contravene the provision if establishing a religion was its "express and single purpose", while Justice Harry Gibbs argued that the section only prohibits the establishment of an official state religion. Each justice in the majority contrasted Section 116 with its equivalent in the US Constitution to find that Section 116 is narrower. The court noted that the US Constitution prohibits laws respecting "establishment of religion" generally, whereas the prohibition in Section 116 is against the establishment of "any religion": this meant that Section 116 did not encompass laws that benefit religions generally; it only proscribed laws that established a particular religion. The approach of the High Court to the establishment limb of Section 116 thus largely reflects the views expressed by Constitutional scholars John Quick and Robert Garran in 1901, that establishment means "the erection and recognition of a State Church, or the concession of special favours, titles, and advantages to one church which are denied to others."

=== "Prohibiting the free exercise of any religion" ===
The protection of the free exercise of religion was also interpreted narrowly in early High Court judgments. In 1912, the court in Krygger v Williams, held that a person could not object to compulsory military service on the ground of religious belief. The court considered that Section 116 would only protect religious observance from government interference; it would not permit a person to be excused from a legal obligation merely because the obligation conflicted with his or her religious beliefs. In a 1929 case, Higgins, then a Justice of the High Court, suggested (as obiter dictum) that a person could lawfully object to compulsory voting on the grounds of religious belief. However, in 1943, the court continued the narrow approach it took in Krygger v Williams, upholding war-time regulations that caused the Adelaide branch of the Jehovah's Witnesses to be dissolved and have its property acquired by the Commonwealth government. The government had declared the branch to be an organisation whose activities were "prejudicial to the defence of the Commonwealth": one of the branch's professed beliefs was that the government was an "organ of Satan". Chief Justice John Latham held that the Constitution permitted the court to "reconcile religious freedom with ordered government".

In a 1997 case known as the Stolen Generations Case, the court upheld an ordinance issued in 1918 that enabled the forcible removal of Indigenous Australian children from their families. The court reasoned that the purpose of the ordinance was not to prohibit the free exercise of religion even though the ordinance may have had that effect. Peter Edge, an academic specialising in religion and the law, thus concludes that Section 116 will only "prevent legislation that has a prohibited purpose, rather than a prohibited effect". In her judgment, Gaudron J, while finding that the provision "cannot be construed as impliedly conferring an independent or free-standing right which, if breached, sounds in damages at the suit of the individual whose interests are thereby affected" left open the possibility that it might nonetheless, in limiting Commonwealth legislative power, apply to a provision that has the effect, as opposed merely to the purpose, of limiting free exercise.

== Commentary ==
When the Constitution took effect in 1901, Quick and Garran argued that Section 116 was redundant as the Commonwealth had not been given the legislative power under Section 51 to establish a religion or prohibit its free exercise. In 1963, Pannam wrote that the provision was regarded "by all as having little practical value". Pannam considered the provision would only become significant if the High Court held that it applied to laws made by governments of the territories.

Constitutional scholar George Williams, writing in 1994, criticised the court's literal interpretation of the provision and others in the Constitution, saying the court has "transformed the Constitution into a wasteland of civil liberties". Williams argues that as an "express guarantee of personal freedom", the provision should be interpreted broadly and promote "individual liberty over the arbitrary exercise of legislative and executive power". Academics Gonzalo Villalta Puig and Steven Tudor have called for the court to broaden Section 116 by finding in it an implied right to the freedom of thought and conscience. In their view most Australians "believe that the Constitution protects the right to freedom of thought and conscience just like it protects other civil and political freedoms", and that the court should give effect to that belief. They argue there is precedent for the court finding implied constitutional rights, such as the 1992 case of Australian Capital Television Pty Ltd v Commonwealth, where the court found that the Constitution guaranteed the freedom of political communication.

In defence of Section 116 and the High Court's interpretation of it, Joshua Puls argues that the provision is appropriately limited, suggesting that a rigid "wall of separation" between religion and the state is undesirable, and that the stronger Constitutional protection of religion in the United States has become overly politicised. Fellow academics Jennifer Clarke, Patrick Keyzer and James Stellios argue that the court's narrow interpretation of the provision is consistent with the intention of the Constitution's drafters, who never intended for it to be a protection of individual rights, while Kevin Booker and Arthur Glass say the provision has "symbolic value". Booker and Glass defend the court's interpretation of the provision and other Constitutional rights, saying "the High Court can only work with the constitutional provisions before it".

== Referendums ==
Federal governments have twice proposed referendums to expand the scope of Section 116: in 1944 and in 1988. In 1944, John Curtin's Labor government put a package of measures, known as the "Fourteen Powers referendum", to the Australian public. The purpose of the package was mainly to widen the Commonwealth's legislative powers for the purposes of post-war reconstruction. The widening of powers would sunset after five years. One of the measures in the package was to extend Section 116 so that it prohibited the states, not merely the Commonwealth, from making the laws proscribed by the section. The package's 14 measures—which included diverse matters such as powers to provide family allowances and legislate for "national health"—were bound together in a single question. H. V. Evatt, the Labor Attorney-General, argued that freedom of religion was "fundamental to the whole idea of democracy" and that the suppression of civil rights by dictatorships in Europe demonstrated the need for Australia to have a strong Constitutional guarantee of the freedom. The conservative United Australia Party, then in opposition and led by Robert Menzies, campaigned against the package. Arthur Fadden, leader of the Country Party, claimed a "yes" vote would permit the government to implement a "policy of socialisation". The package was rejected: the national "yes" vote was less than 46 per cent, and there was majority support for the package only in South Australia and Western Australia. One reason for the rejection was the bundling of multiple controversial proposals into one question: voters could not vote in favour of the measures they supported and against those they opposed, giving them reason to vote against the entire package.

A similar proposal to amend Section 116 was put to the Australian people in a referendum in 1988. The referendum contained four questions, the last of which sought to amend Section 116 and other constitutional "rights and freedoms". Again, the proposal was initiated by a Labor government (under Bob Hawke); again, the proposal was opposed by the conservative parties; and again, multiple controversial proposals were bound into one question, being "to alter the Constitution to extend the right to trial by jury, to extend freedom of religion, and to ensure fair terms for persons whose property is acquired by any government." The proposal in respect of Section 116 was to extend its operation to the states, and expand the protection to cover any government act (not just legislation) that established a religion or prohibited its free exercise. Some church officials objected to the proposal, fearing that funding of religious schools by the states could become unlawful. The question failed to pass, being opposed by a majority of voters in each of the states. The 70 to 30 per cent nationwide vote against the proposal was the largest margin by which a proposal to amend the Constitution had ever been defeated at a referendum. Williams attributes the failure of the proposal mainly to the absence of bipartisan support for it, highlighting the "determined and effective" opposition of senior Liberal Party politician Peter Reith. Williams also points to the "notorious reluctance" of Australians to support Constitutional referendums: of the 44 proposals to amend the Constitution, only eight have succeeded.
