= Abergowrie State School =

Primary school in Queensland, Australia

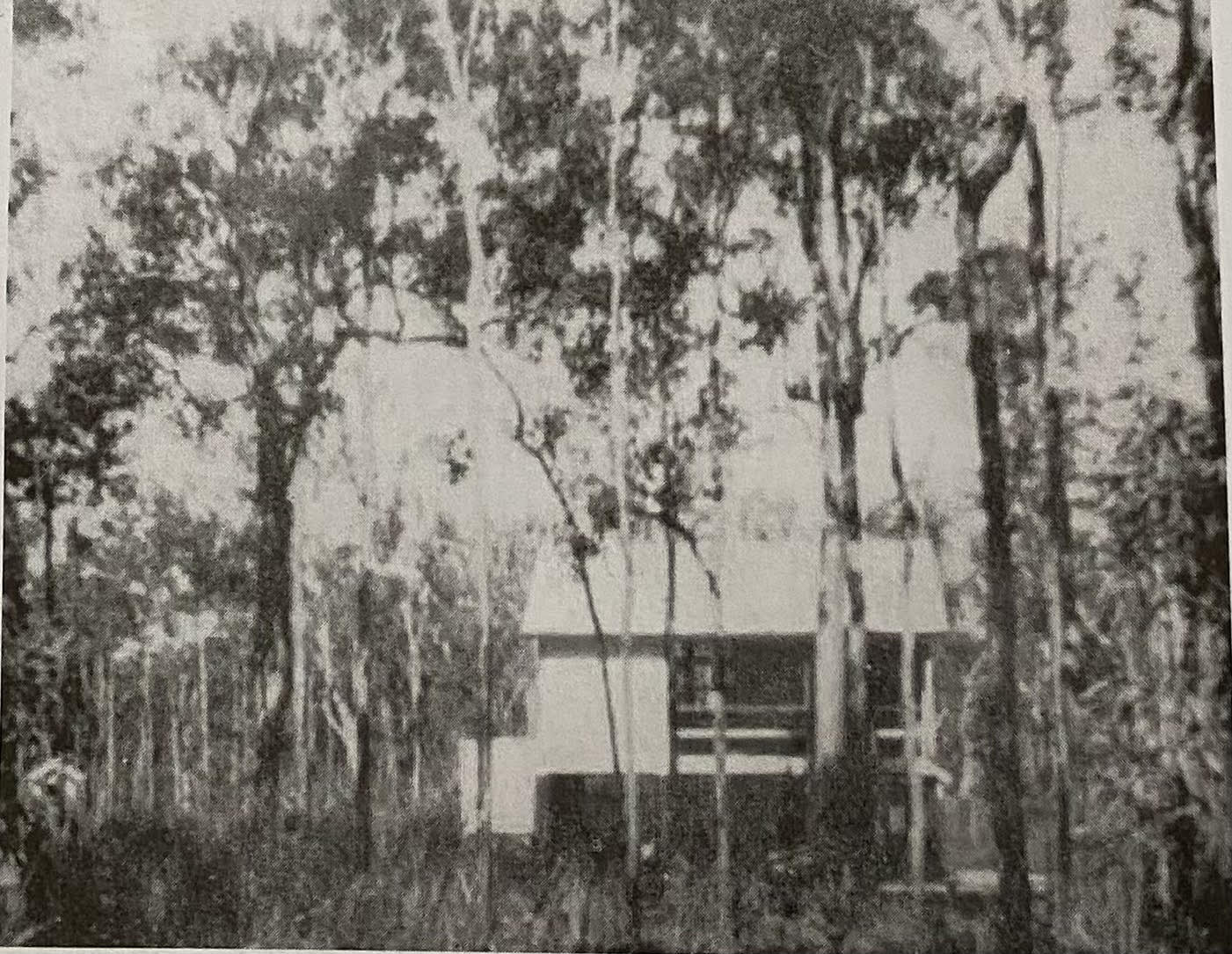
- Abergowrie State School, 1953

Location
- 5 Venables Road; Abergowrie, Queensland, Australia; 18.47478°S 145.88340°E

Information
- School type: Public co-educational primary
- Motto: Nihil Sine Labore (Nothing without hard work)
- Established: 1953
- Principal: Aaron Davies
- Years offered: Prep – Year 6
- Enrolment: 7 (2023)
- Website: Official site

Abergowrie State School is a public co-educational primary school located in the town of Abergowrie in the Shire of Hinchinbrooke, Queensland, Australia. It is administered by the Queensland Department of Education, with an enrolment of seven students and a teaching staff of two, as of 2023. The school serves students from Prep to Year 6.

Due to the school's low enrolment figures, the school collaborates with a number of other schools within the region on curriculum development and in inter-school sporting events. Although enrolment has declined, with many parents opting to send their children to schools in the nearby town of Ingham, the Education Department has chosen to keep the school open due to the distance of other educational facilities.

The school celebrated its 70th anniversary on 11 November 2023. A school zone was also introduced the very same year, causing the speed limit to drop from 100 km/h to 60 km/h during school hours.

== History ==
Gordon Murphy, the then Regional Director of the Northern Educational Region, appears to have been the first to initiate plans to establish a primary school in Abergowrie. He sent Frederick Nothdurft, the then District Inspector, to Abergowrie in May 1951 to investigate a need for a school. By then, there were only seven school aged kids within the region, but Nothdurft suggested in his report that a site for a school should be located near St Teresa's Agricultural College due to the likelihood of population development. When a bus route in the region began, these kids were sent to Long Pocket State School. They were picked up at 7am and often waited hours to be picked up by the bus after school had ended. In some cases, students returned home as late as 6pm.

A resident of Abergowrie had spent a considerable amount of time collecting the names of school aged children for a school within the region to be considered and in early 1952, eight acres of land was set aside for 'school purposes' in the Abergowrie town plan. On 1 April 1952, a public meeting took place to consider applying for a school with the Education Department, which subsequently led to an application with a list of prospective pupils being sent in. Within the very same month, another district inspector, A. H. Biddle, was sent to the region to conduct another investigation into the matter and ultimately concluded that a school should be established.

On 12 June 1952, the Education Department approved the construction of a state school. By November of the very same year, £2,224 was set aside for the construction. Under the supervision of T. J. Cook, the district supervisor from the Department of Public Works, the construction of the school building commenced during the Christmas and New Year period. Work was well underway by January 1953 and was completed by mid-February.

The school opened on 23 February 1953 and was officially opened by the MLA for Hinchinbrook at the time, Cecil Jesson. Shortly after its opening, student enrolment was estimated to peak at 28, however, by 13 March 1953, student enrolment had reached 44 and was continuing to grow, despite the school's maximum capacity being 40. It was noted that additional accommodation was needed. By 1954, the school's enrolment had reached 86. The construction of an additional room was approved in 1954; however, the shortage of materials prevented its erection. The timber had been obtained by March but was stuck in Maryborough due to the local floods at the time. It began construction in April but was not completed until much later that year due to further difficulties and delays. The school's overcrowding at this time was so severe that one class was taught under the school during the construction of the extra classroom.

Construction on a teachers' residence was approved and completed in 1955 at the cost of £3,166. The following year, another classroom and a library were constructed and in 1957 electricity was installed in the school and the teachers' residence. Between 1957 and 1978, another classroom and a larger library were added. Tennis Courts were opened in November 1977 by the member for Hinchinbrook at the time, Edward Row.

The school celebrated its golden jubilee on 26 April 2003. The celebrations included a Dusk service on the 25 April, which approximately 500 people attended. Approximately 1000 people attended the celebrations the following day. The event was organised by Carlo Cavallo.

== Demographics ==
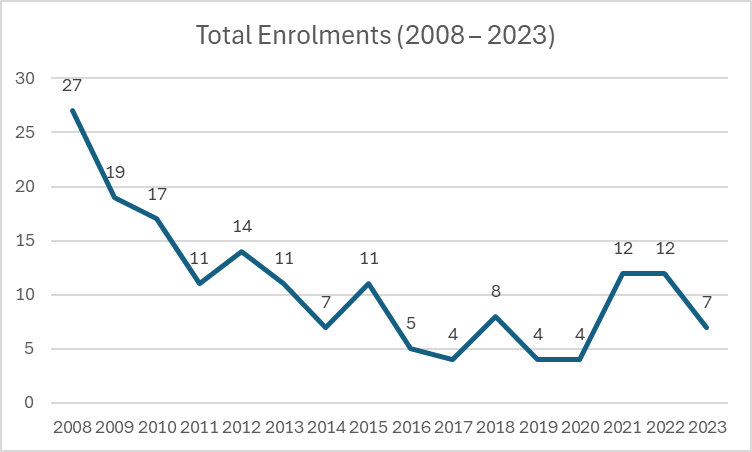
Abergowrie State School Enrolment Data from 2008 to 2023

In 2021, the school had a student enrolment of 12 students with two teachers (1.4 full-time equivalent) and five non-teaching staff (1.8 full-time equivalent). Female enrolments consisted of six students and Male enrolments consisted of six students; Indigenous enrolments accounted for a total of 0% and 0% of students had a language background other than English.

In 2022, the school had a student enrolment of 12 students with two teachers (1.4 full-time equivalent) and five non-teaching staff (1.9 full-time equivalent). Female enrolments consisted of seven students and Male enrolments consisted of five students; Indigenous enrolments accounted for a total of 33% and 0% of students had a language background other than English.

In 2023, the school had a student enrolment of seven with two teachers (1.4 full-time equivalent) and five non-teaching staff (2 full-time equivalent). Female enrolments consisted of five students and Male enrolments consisted of two students; Indigenous enrolments accounted for a total of 14% and 9% of students had a language background other than English.

== Academic achievement ==
NAPLAN results are not publicly available because they require at least 11 participants and an 80% participation rate to be released. However, the school achieved 100% (or close to) participation in the Premier's Reading Challenge for 2015, 2018, 2020 and 2022.

== Indigenous engagement ==
In 2021, the school introduced an Indigenous yarning circle "to connect its school community with the area's traditional owners." The Hinchinbrook Shire Council provided $1,238 in community grants to the Parents and Community Association of the school to assist with the official opening. Following this, the school established the Native Bush Tucker Garden and introduced the Warrgamay language into the curriculum. Due to these efforts, the school won the Education category in the 2024 Queensland Reconciliation Awards.

== Sport houses ==
The school originally had three houses for sporting events, Alamein, Kokoda and Tobruk, which were named after the locations where Australian soldiers had fought during World War II to commemorate the soldier settlement in the area. However, due to low enrolment numbers, the school reduced the number of houses to two in 2001. They were named Yamanie and Blencoe, after the Waterfalls on the upper Herbert River.

== Environmental initiatives ==
In 2009, the school received solar panels, along with energy efficient fluoro light rods. There were a few problems with the solar panels during installation, but they were resolved. It provides the school with up to 3.5kwH of electricity.

=== Past environmental initiatives ===
In 1975, the school introduced a native tree plot, a garden with a variety of plants with some bird pools. It began with an Education Centenary tree being planted in 1975. By 1978, it had become "a haven of peace and coolness".

In 2010, there were three separate bins near the student lunch area, a recycling, compost and a general waste bin, which students were taught how to use. After lunchtime, a student would empty the compost bin into a bigger compost bin and rinse out the small compost bin. Shredded paper was also put into this bin. The very same year, students were taught to re-use paper before recycling them. Old paper from the Fax machine was put into a pile to be used again by students, which led to new A4 paper being required less often.

== See also ==
- Education in Queensland
- List of schools in North Queensland
