= Adelaide Co of Jehovah's Witnesses Inc v Commonwealth =

Judgement of the High Court of Australia

- Court: High Court of Australia
- Full case name: Adelaide Company of Jehovah's Witnesses Incorporated v The Commonwealth of Australia
- Decided: 14 June 1943
- Citations: [1943] HCA 12, (1943) 67 CLR 116

Court membership
- Judges sitting: Latham CJ, Rich, Starke, McTiernan & Williams JJ

Case opinions
- (5:0) the National Security (Subversive Associations) Regulations did not contravene section 116 of the Australian Constitution (per curiam) (5:0) the power under the regulations to seize any building containing property connected to a subversive association was beyond the Commonwealth's defence powers under s51(vi) of the Constitution (per curiam)

Adelaide Co of Jehovah's Witnesses Inc v Commonwealth was a court case decided in the High Court of Australia on 14 June 1943.

In January 1941, acting pursuant to the National Security (Subversive Organisations) Regulations 1940, the Government of Australia declared Jehovah's Witnesses to be "prejudicial to the defence of the Commonwealth" and to the "efficient prosecution of the war". Police immediately occupied premises of the organisation.

In September 1941, Jehovah's Witnesses applied to the High Court for an injunction to restrain the Commonwealth from further trespassing on their premises, and seeking damages. The Witnesses argued that the regulations contravened the express constitutional protections for freedom from religious discrimination contained in section 116 of the Australian Constitution, which states:

The Commonwealth shall not make any law for establishing any religion, or for imposing any religious observance, or for prohibiting the free exercise of any religion, and no religious test shall be required as a qualification for any office or public trust under the Commonwealth.

The court unanimously held that the National Security (Subversive Organisations) Regulations 1940 did not infringe against section 116, but that the government had exceeded the scope of the Commonwealth's "defence power" in section 51(vi) of the Constitution.

This was only the second case to consider section 116. The first had been Krygger v Williams. In that case, the protections afforded by section 116 had been defined very narrowly.

== See also ==
- Australian constitutional law
