= Sectarianism in Australia =

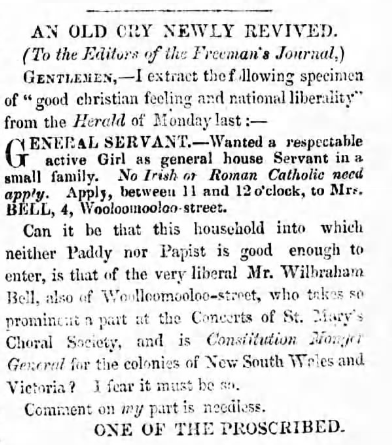
A denunciation of anti-Catholic and anti-Irish bigotry in Sydney's The Catholic Weekly, 24 December 1853.

Sectarianism in Australia is a historical legacy from the eighteenth, nineteenth and twentieth centuries, when Australia was a sectarian society divided between Catholics – predominantly but not exclusively of Irish background – on the one hand and Protestants of British heritage on the other.

== Protestant Ascendancy and anti-Irishness as founding cultures of the nascent Australia ==
The officials on board the First Fleet who founded the penal colony of New South Wales in 1788 brought anti-Catholicism views with them, which laid the foundation for sectarian divides thanks to the Irishmen and women who also came on the First Fleet. The settlement was perpetually on high alert in case of risings led by exiled Irish political prisoners – there were rebellions in Ireland in 1798 and 1803 and many involved had been transported to Australia – in the context of war with republican France. No Catholic chaplains were permitted in the colony for its first thirty years, except for a brief period in 1803–4 when it was hoped a priest would have a moderating influence.

Long-established Protestant hatred of Irish Catholics coalesced with contemporary fears of a pro-French republican fifth column and the Irish convicts and settlers – most of whom spoke Irish as their community language until the 1850s – represented a separate ethnos to be kept under constant suspicion and both formal and informal surveillance. Ironically, many of the Irish republican convicts who were prisoners after the 1798 rebellion were, in fact, Protestants. Nonetheless, it is recorded that predominantly Catholic Irish-speaking prisoners were frequently singled out for physical maltreatment by the authorities and occasionally murdered by British convicts for speaking Irish who believed they were secretly conspiring against them in a language which only they spoke.

== Loyalism as state culture ==
In the latter half of the nineteenth century, the immediate threat of an Irish convict seizure of the penal colony largely evaporated, though anti-Irish and anti-Catholic suspicions did not, particularly given the massive Irish migration occurring as a consequence of the Great Irish Famine between 1845 and 1849. Irish and Scottish involvement in the Eureka Stockade in 1854 and the transportation of Fenians (including their subsequent rescue) in the 1860s meant the loyalism and other Protestant ascendancy values (including Orangeism) brought by Protestant Irish immigrants was perceived to be under threat, worsening sectarianism divides. Loyalism and anti-Catholicism remained pre-eminent values in the colony in the second half of the nineteenth century, though some Catholics in the Australian colonies attained positions of power by adopting vocally loyalist public postures.

== Position of Irish Catholics and Anglo-Saxon Protestants ==
Irish Catholics were a greater proportion of the population in Australia than they had been in Ireland, and they enjoyed an ostensibly more level playing field when it came to community relations and national influence. This was particularly noticeable in civic society, where the increasingly urban Irish Catholic population played a disproportionate role in the labour movement, including the foundation of the Australian Labor Party, and were in direct political opposition to the disproportionate role in business played by Anglicans and Presbyterians who were typically involved in conservative politics. Sectarian antipathy between the two blocs characterised Australian society and politics in the 1920s and 1930s with Protestants using Freemasonry to express a solidarity based on social and political anti-Catholic attitudes. This developed into a strong and mythic tendency sustained until the 1950s for most Catholics to vote Labor and for most Anglicans, Presbyterians and Methodists to vote for their conservative opponents.

== Irish nationalism and a resurgent Empire loyalism ==
Towards the end of nineteenth century and in the first half of the twentieth century, growing unrest in Ireland – for example, the Land War – constantly fed sectarian tensions between Catholics of Irish nationalist background and Protestants of unionist background. This divide became starkly and bitterly apparent during the First World War: Anglo-Saxon Protestants were reflexively enthusiastic supporters of the war and conscription, in line with the establishment culture of loyalism; conversely, Irish-Scottish Catholics were reflexively critical of both. When the Australian government tried to introduce conscription it was defeated – on two occasions by referendum) – leading to a split in the ALP. Prominent Irish Catholic campaigners against the war and conscription such as Archbishop Daniel Mannix were widely denounced in public as traitors by Protestants. The 1916 Easter Rising in Ireland heightened the anti-Irish and anti-Catholic atmosphere, even though most prominent Catholics – including Archbishop Mannix – condemned the Rising.

The Irish War of Independence worsened sectarianism tensions in Australia even further. Anglo-Australian Protestants saw the First World War as a definitive loyalist experience in which Australia had contributed significantly to the honour and prestige of the British Empire and organised loyalist rallies to counter those calling for home rule in Ireland; with the same reasoning, they considered Irish Australian Catholics with Irish nationalist sympathies to be treacherous – regardless of the fact that large numbers of Irish Australian Catholics had signed up, fought in the Australian military and served on the European and Middle Eastern fronts. Anglo-Australian Protestant ex-serviceman formed loyalist paramilitary organisations in preparation for a final confrontation with Irish Australian Catholics in an atmosphere of severe sectarian and ethnic suspicion. After the Anglo-Irish Treaty, partition of Ireland and Irish Civil War, sectarianism became less explicit but did not disappear: Australian conservatives – primarily Protestant – were still strongly loyalist and antipathetic to the existence of the 'disloyal' Irish Free State.

== Demographic and cultural shifts ==
When Australia entered the Second World War there was no repeat of the public anti-Catholic denunciations that had characterised society in 1914, even when in 1941 the Japanese capture of Singapore, which left Australia largely undefended. Large numbers of Catholics and Protestants alike joined up to fight with Australian formations during the war. Similarly, when Australian troops fought in the Korean War and Vietnam War, sectarianism did not pit Protestant against Catholic in supporting or opposing either conflict. The coronation of Queen Elizabeth in 1953 and her tour around Australia in 1954 did not attract sectarian comment, either in terms of calls of 'disloyalty' from Anglo-Australian Protestants to Irish Australian Catholics, or in terms of calls of 'fawning' from vice versa. One commentator considers that anti-Catholic sectarianism in Australia expired in the 1950s when the predominantly Protestant conservative government of the time agreed to state aid for Catholic schools.

Nonetheless, the Australia of the 1950s was still an Australia in which notions of Catholicism and Protestantism, loyalism and disloyalism, were of everyday noteworthiness. Catholics were still associated with Irishness, Protestants with Britishness, though, as Australia moved away from Britain, the division became less distinct. This was enabled in part by the mass migration in the 1950s, 1960s and 1970s of large numbers of non-British and non-Irish immigrants, primarily from Italy, Greece, Malta, and Eastern Europe. Old enmities simply made less sense in this new cosmopolitan demographic environment.

What is more, the entry of Britain into the Common Market in 1973 devalued the long-cherished Anglo-Australian Protestant value of loyalism. Around the same time, republicanism in Australia, largely divested of its historical insinuations, became a real possibility with the election of – and subsequent dismissal of – the Whitlam Labor Government, which led to the dismantlement of ties with Britain had hitherto characterised Australian foreign policy These reforms were continued during the 1980s and led, ultimately, to the Australia Act of 1986 which removed the power of the British Parliament to legislate for Australia.

== Echoes of sectarianism ==
Though sectarianism had died down compared to the colonial era, it has largely metamorphosed into a debate concerning to what extent an independent nation should retain symbolic manifestations of its historical links to Great Britain, though Australian sectarianism also led to the re-emergence of Hibernophobic sentiments in the 1970s and 1980s. Recognition, however, that sectarianism as an everyday influence was a thing of the past was most clearly seen in the Republic referendum campaign in 1999, where a number of commentators suggested that, broadly speaking, monarchists were more likely to be Protestants of British descent and republicans were more likely to be Catholics of Irish descent and that the republican debate itself risked resurrecting sectarian enmity between the two groups.

In 2016, prior to the conviction, and eventual acquittal, of Cardinal Pell, the writer Frank O'Shea commented that the debate around the Cardinal in Australia was frequently coloured by an undercurrent of sectarianism.

== Australia today ==
In contemporary Australia, sectarianism between Catholics and Protestants is extant, but minimal and occasionally raises comment, though the issue intermittently reappears – for example, in discussion of sexual abuse being associated with certain denominations, or when politicians are said to follow their faith more than the public interest in deciding matters of public policy.

== See also ==
- Anti-Catholicism#Australia

== Bibliography ==
- Coogan, Tim Pat (2000). Wherever Green is Worn: The Story of the Irish Diaspora. London: Arrow.
- Franklin, J. (1999). "Catholics versus Masons" (PDF). Journal of the Australian Catholic Historical Society. 20: 1–15.
- Hogan, Michael (1987). The Sectarian Strand: Religion in Australian History. Ringwood, Victoria: Penguin Books. ISBN 978-0-14-009295-0., a major scholarly history
- Hughes, Robert (1986). The Fatal Shore. London: Harvill.
- Keneally, Thomas (2007). The Commonwealth of Thieves.
- Kildea, Jeff. Tearing the Fabric: Sectarianism in Australia 1910-1925 (Citadel Books, Sydney, 2002) ISBN 978-0-9581019-0-5; 379 pages; a major scholarly history
- Kildea, Jeff. " Sectarianism, Politics and Australia's Catholics," The Sydney papers (Winter 2002) pp. 161–167. online
- Kildea, Jeff. "Sectarian rioting in Australia." Journal of the Australian Catholic Historical Society 45 (2024): 51-69. 1922 riots
- Knightley, Philip (2001). Australia: a Biography of a Nation. London: Vintage.
- Lyons, Mark. " Sectarianism" in Oxford Companion to Australian Politics. (2007; online 2008) ISBN 978-0-19-173520-2, 978-0-19-555543-1
- Lyons, Mark. " Aspects of Sectarianism, New South Wales 1865 to 1880" (PhD. Dissertation, Australian National University; ProQuest Dissertations & Theses, 1972. 28813787).
- Macintyre (2000). A Concise History of Australia.
- Rickard, Jonathon (1996). Australia: a Cultural History. London: Longman.

=== Primary sources. ===
- Clark, Manning, ed. Documents in Australian history, 1851–1900 (1955) pp. 710–733.
