= Attorney-General (Vic) (Ex rel Black) v Commonwealth =

Judgement of the High Court of Australia

- Court: High Court of Australia
- Decided: 11 February 1981
- Citations: [1981] HCA 2 (1981) 146 CLR 559

Case opinions
- Concurrence: Barwick CJ, Gibbs, Stephen, Mason, Aickin, Wilson
- Dissent: Murphy

Attorney-General (Vic) ex rel Black v Commonwealth (popularly known as the DOGS case) was a 1981 Australia High Court case that held federal funding of non-government schools operated by religious organisations did not contravene the establishment clause when the funding was for ordinary educational purposes.

== Australian Constitution ==
Section 116 of the Australian Constitution states that:

The Commonwealth shall not make any law for establishing any religion, or for imposing any religious observance, or for prohibiting the free exercise of any religion, and no religious test shall be required as a qualification for any office or public trust under the Commonwealth.

== Decision ==
Justice Gibbs believed that the words "The Commonwealth shall not make any law for establishing any religion", where they appear in s. 116 mean that the Commonwealth Parliament shall not make any law for conferring on a particular religion or religious body the position of a state (or national) religion or church."

== Background to the Case ==
In 1962 St Brigids Primary School needed to refurbish its students toilets but the parish could not source the funding to do so eventually resulting in 2,000 catholic students to compete to fill 640 local public school places - an action known as the Goulburn School Strike. This led the Catholic education system to lobby the federal government to start providing state aid to non-government which it succeeded in doing in 1964.

From 1964 to 1981 the advocacy group 'Defence of Government Schools' (DOGS) brought a High Court case to test the validity of Australian state government funding of religious schools. The DOGS argued that religious schools breached Section 116 of the Australian Constitution.

== See also ==
- Defence of Government Schools
