= Premier's Reading Challenge =

School reading challenge in the Australian states

The Premier's Reading Challenge is a literacy initiative developed by Australian state governments. It is set not as a competitive event, but rather as an individual challenge to each student, as well as to promote a love of reading books. The challenge is run in New South Wales, Queensland, South Australia, Western Australia and Victoria. Tasmania's Labor government joined the other states in 2008.

The Premier's Reading Challenge in South Australia, launched by Premier Mike Rann (2002 to 2011) has one of the highest participation rates in the world for reading challenges. It has been embraced by more than 95% of public, private and religious schools.

== Guidelines ==
The guidelines for the program in each state differ slightly, but students must generally read a minimum of books within a certain number of books, within a certain amount of time. In some states, these books must be a combination of personal choice books and books from a pre-selected list of approved literature.

In South Australia the Premier's Reading Challenge involves students from Reception to Year 12 in reading a minimum of 12 books (but often many more) upon which they are tested for comprehension. At the end of their first year in the Challenge successful students receive a certificate signed by the Premier. At the end of the second year they receive a bronze medal. Then, in subsequent years, silver, gold, "legend" and "hall of fame". Top sports stars, celebrities and children's authors are appointed Premier's Reading Challenge Ambassadors and visit schools to promote the program and read to students. Former Premier Mike Rann, who proposed the Ambassadors and medal components of the scheme, said the medals and end of year medal ceremonies at schools contributed to the success of the program. "At first the younger children love the idea of the medals but then they fall in love with the books", Rann said.

== In special needs schools ==
The NSW Premier's Reading Challenge has been used at Mary Brooksbank School, to help give the pupils with intellectual difficulties as many educational opportunities as are possible. The 50 students which attend the school have all successfully completed the challenge in two consecutive years. Many of the students cannot read independently, and so the books on the list were read to them by the teachers.

== In the news ==
In 2005, the Victorian Premier's Reading Challenge attracted over 130,000 students, with 60,000 of them meeting the requirements for the award by reading 12 books in the set time. In six months, over 1,000,000 books were read by the students.

The Sun-Herald provided an online section of its website which provides links to articles which can be used as part of the personal choices reading by students in the New South Wales Reading Challenge.

== See also ==
- Education in Australia
- Literacy education
