= Catholic education in Australia =

Education administered by the Catholic Church in Australia

Catholic education in Australia refers to the education services provided by the Catholic Church in Australia within the Australian education system. From 18th century foundations, the Catholic education system has grown to be the second biggest provider of school-based education in Australia, after government schools. The Catholic Church has established primary, secondary and tertiary educational institutions in Australia. As of 2018, one in five Australian students attend Catholic schools. There are 1,755 Catholic schools in Australia with more than 777,000 students enrolled, employing almost 100,000 staff.

Administrative oversight of Catholic education providers varies depending on the origins, ethos, and purpose of each education provider. Oversight of Catholic systemic schools may rest with a Catholic parish, diocese, or archdiocese; while religious institutes have oversight of Catholic independent schools; and Catholic universities are administered through an academic senate.

== Schools ==
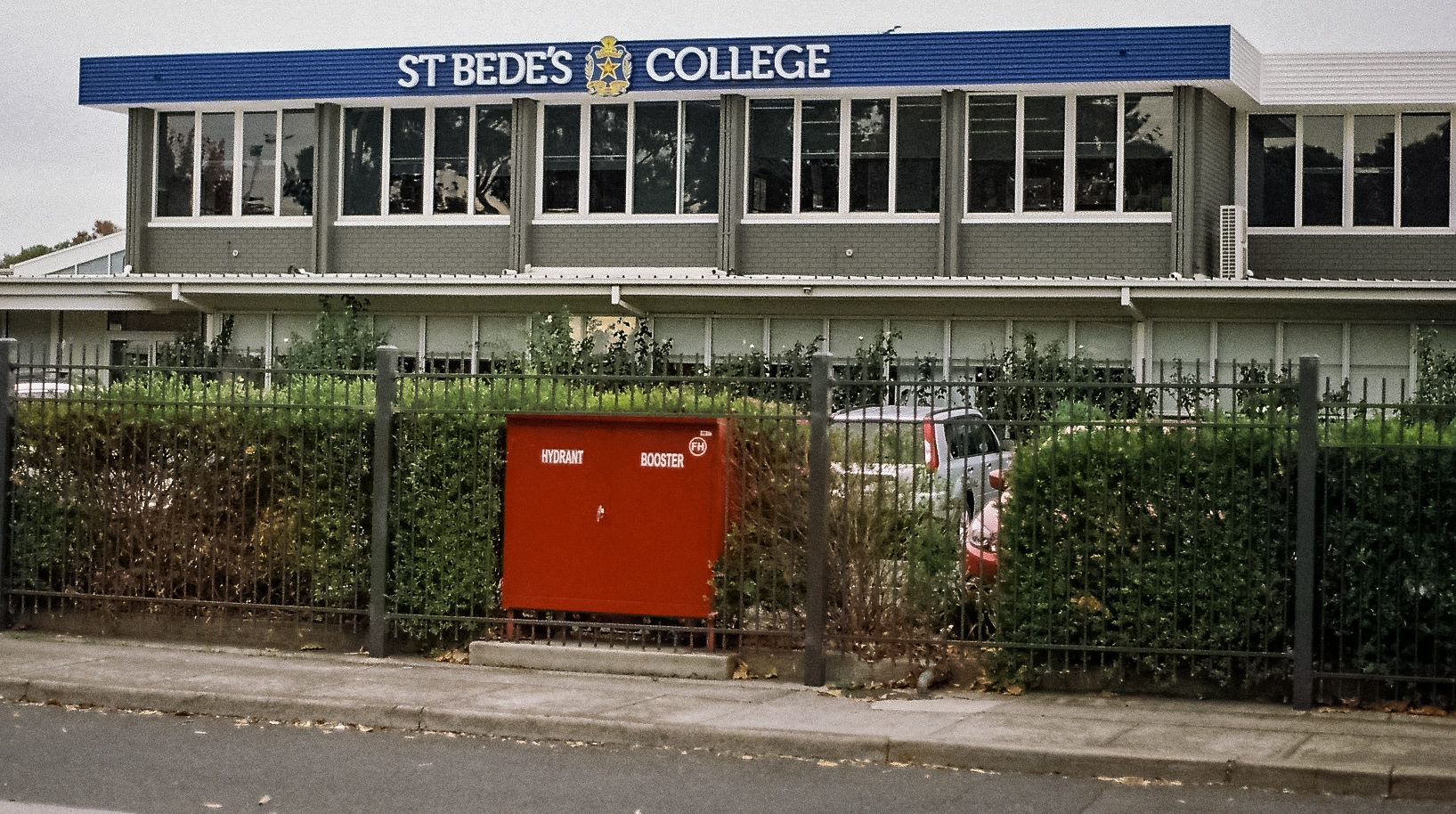
St Bede's Bentleigh East in Victoria

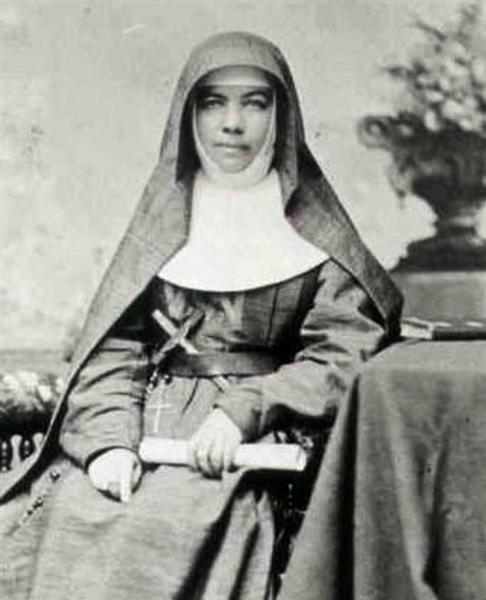
Mary MacKillop established an extensive network of schools for the poor and is Australia's first canonised saint of the Catholic Church

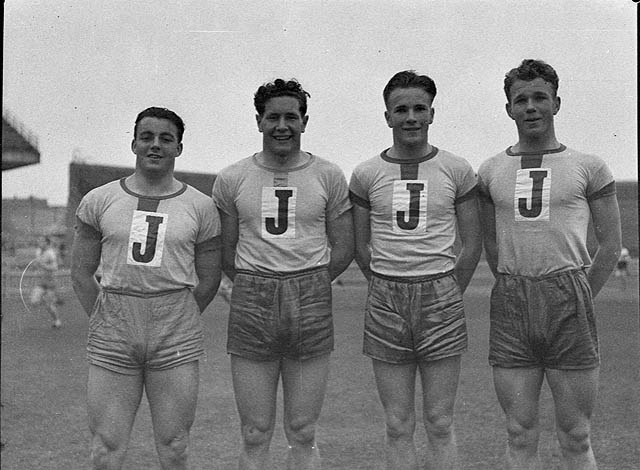
GPS athletes from St Joseph's College, Hunters Hill, pictured in 1939

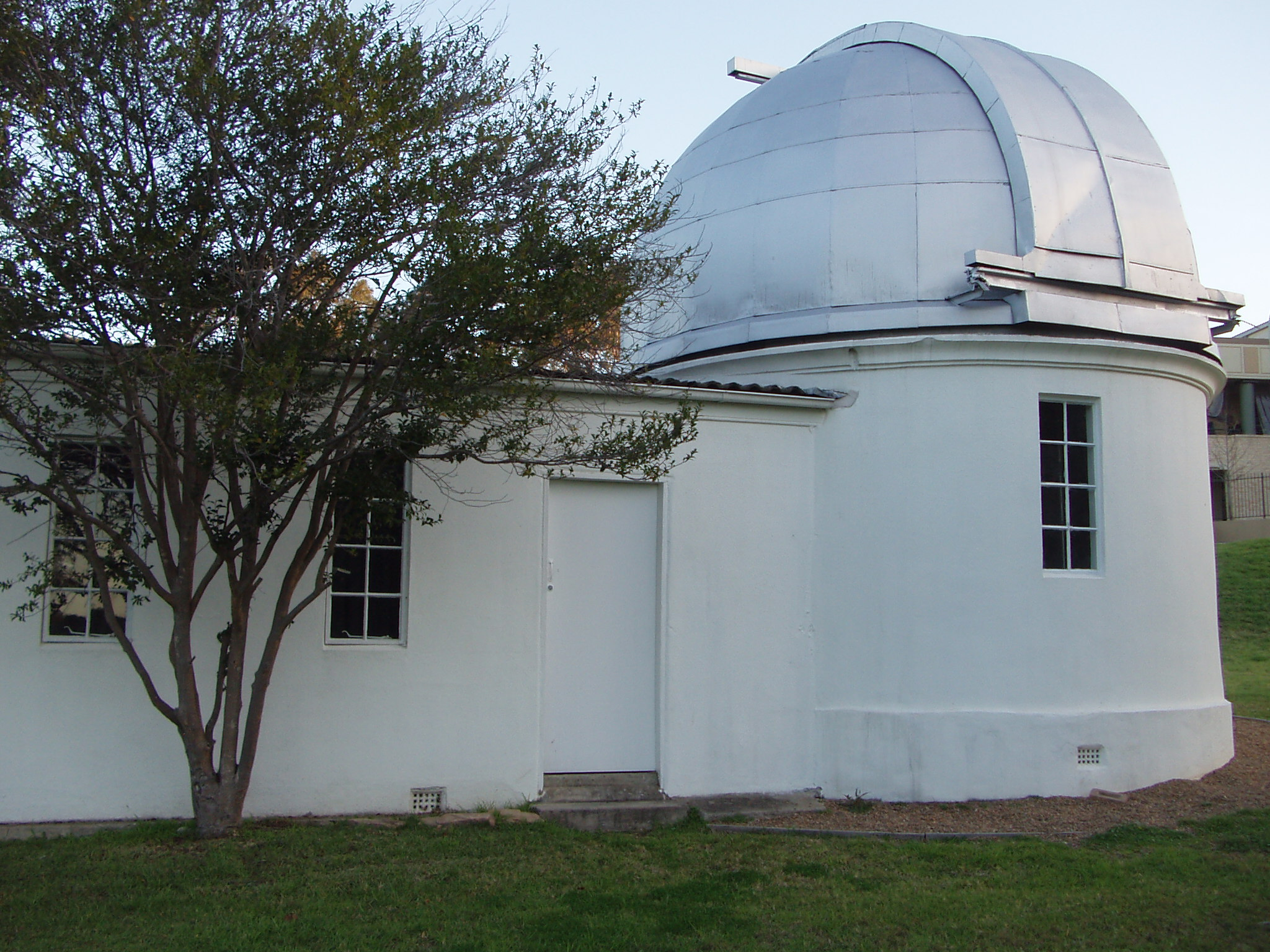
The observatory at Saint Ignatius' College, Riverview was founded by the distinguished Jesuit scientist Edward Francis Pigot in 1908

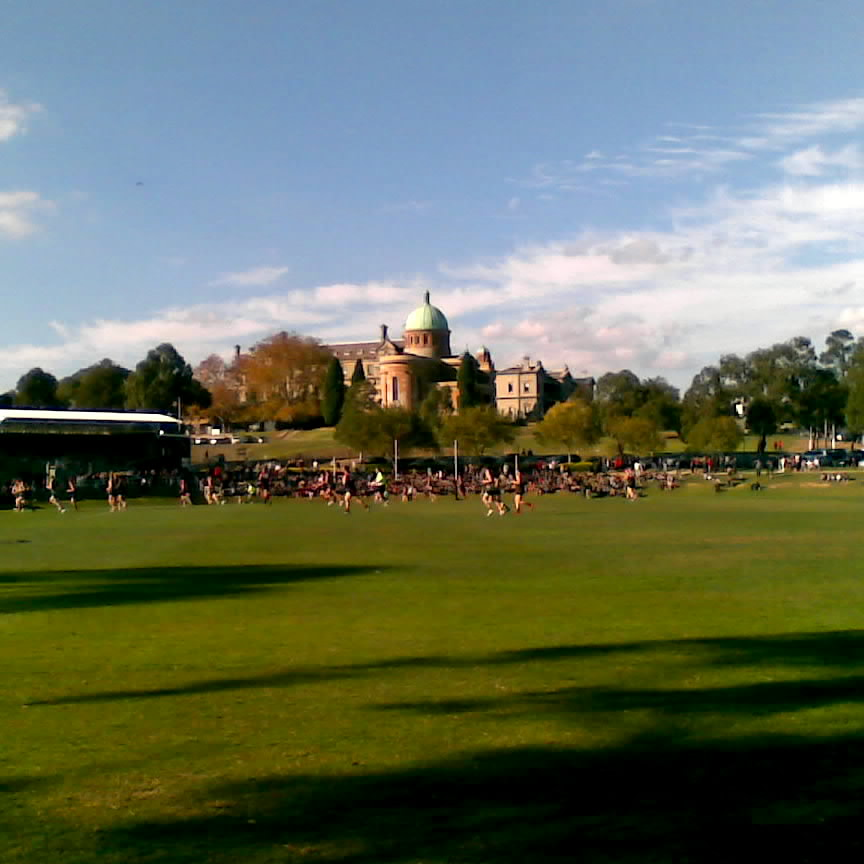
Memorial Chapel on top of the hill overlooking a game of Australian rules football being played on the Roche Oval, Xavier College, Melbourne

=== History ===
The first permanent Catholics in Australia came on the First Fleet to Sydney in 1788. One-tenth of all the convicts who came to Australia on the First Fleet were Catholic and at least half of them were born in Ireland. A small proportion of British marines were also Catholic.

Just as the British were setting up the new colony, French captain Jean-François de Galaup, comte de Lapérouse arrived off Botany Bay with two ships. La Pérouse was six weeks in Port Jackson, where the French, besides other things, held Catholic Masses.

Some of the Irish convicts had been transported to Australia for political crimes or social rebellion in Ireland, so the authorities were suspicious of the minority church for the first three decades of settlement. Catholic convicts were compelled to attend Church of England services and their children and orphans were raised by the authorities as Anglicans. The first Catholic priest colonists arrived in Australia as convicts in 1800 – convicted for "complicity" in the Irish Rebellion of 1798. The Irish-led Castle Hill convict rebellion of 1804 alarmed the British authorities and the priests permission to celebrate Mass was revoked. Priests were not officially permitted to travel to the colony until 1820.

At first, the Church of England was the established Christian church in the colony, and during the early years of transportation all convicts were required to attend Anglican services on Sundays. This included Irish Catholics as well as Jews. Similarly, education in the new settlement was Anglican-controlled until the 1840s.

Free "charity schools" run by other denominations gradually came into existence later.

The absence of a Catholic mission in Australia before 1818 reflected the legal disabilities of Catholics in Britain and the difficult position of Ireland within the British Empire, but by 1833, there were around ten Catholic schools in the Australian colonies. The Church of England lost its legal privileges in the Colony of New South Wales following the Church Act of 1836. Drafted by the Catholic attorney-general John Plunkett, the act established legal equality for Anglicans, Catholics and Presbyterians and was later extended to Methodists.

John Bede Polding, a Benedictine monk, was Sydney's first bishop (and then archbishop) from 1835 to 1877. Polding requested a community of nuns be sent to the colony and five Irish Sisters of Charity arrived in 1838. While tensions arose between the English Benedictine hierarchy and the Irish Ignatian-tradition order from the start, the sisters set about pastoral care in a women's prison and began visiting hospitals and schools and establishing employment for convict women. In 1847, two sisters transferred to Hobart and established a school. The sisters went on to establish hospitals in four of the eastern states.

At Polding's request, the Christian Brothers arrived in Sydney in 1843 to assist in schools but the Irish-English divide proved problematic and the brothers returned to Ireland. In 1857, Polding founded an Australian order of nuns in the Benedictine tradition – the Sisters of the Good Samaritan – to work in education and social work.

Establishing themselves first at Sevenhill, in the newly established colony of South Australia in 1848, the Jesuits were the first religious order of priests to enter and establish houses in South Australia, Victoria, Queensland and the Northern Territory – Austrian Jesuits established themselves in the south and north and Irish in the east. The Australian gold rushes saw a rapid increase in the population and prosperity of the colonies. While the Austrian priests traversed the Outback on horseback to found missions and schools, the Irish priests arrived in the east in 1860 and had by 1880 established the major schools of Xavier College in Melbourne, St Aloysius' College and Saint Ignatius' College, Riverview in Sydney – which each survive to the present.

In 1872, Victoria became the first Australian colony to pass an education act providing for free, secular public education. The other colonies followed over the following two decades. With the subsequent withdrawal of state aid for church schools around 1880, the Catholic Church, unlike other Australian churches, put great energy and resources into creating a comprehensive alternative system of education. It was largely staffed by sisters, brothers and priests of religious congregations, such as the Christian Brothers (who had returned to Australia in 1868); the Sisters of Mercy (who had arrived in Perth in 1846); Marist Brothers, who came from France in 1872; the Patrician Brothers from Ireland in 1883, and the Sisters of St Joseph, founded in Australia by Mary MacKillop and Fr Julian Tenison Woods in 1867. MacKillop travelled throughout Australasia and established schools, convents and charitable institutions but came into conflict with those bishops who preferred diocesan control of the order rather than central control from Adelaide by the Josephite order. MacKillop administered the Josephites as a national order at a time when Australia was divided among individually governed colonies. She is today the most revered of Australian Catholics, canonised by Pope Benedict XVI in 2010. Catholic schools flourished in Australia and by 1900 there were 115 Christian Brothers teaching in Australia. By 1910 there were 5000 sisters from all congregations teaching in schools.

Following the Second Vatican Council of the 1960s, the church experienced huge changes but also began to suffer a decline in vocations to the religious life, leading to a priest shortage. On the other hand, Catholic education under lay leadership has expanded, and about 20% of Australian school students attend a Catholic school. In 1962, Goulburn was the focus of the fight for state aid to non-government schools. The Goulburn School Strike was called in response to a demand for installation of three extra toilets at a local Catholic primary school, St Brigid's. The local Catholic archdiocese closed down all local Catholic primary schools and sent the children to the government schools. The Catholic authorities declared that they had no money to install the extra toilets. Nearly 1,000 children turned up to be enrolled locally and the state schools were unable to accommodate them. The strike lasted only a week but generated national debate. In 1963 the prime minister, Robert Menzies, made state aid for science blocks part of his party's platform. Since the late 1960s, generous funding from state and federal governments has sustained the Catholic education system.

Australia's post-World War II multicultural immigration program has seen a diversification of the Catholic population of Australia away from its predominantly Irish roots – with Catholics arriving from nations like Italy, Lebanon, Malta, Vietnam and Sudan and changing the face of the student population undergoing Catholic education.

Allegations of sexual abuse by staff associated with Catholic education in Australia have received widespread media and community scrutiny. In 1996, the Australian Church issued a document, Towards Healing, which it described as seeking to "establish a compassionate and just system for dealing with complaints of abuse". Papal apologies followed from John Paul II and Benedict XVI. Outside the church, Broken Rites, a not-for-profit organisation, was formed in 1983 with the aim of researching the cover-up of sexual abuse in the Catholic Church.

As of 2018, one in five Australian pupils attend Catholic schools. As with other classes of non-government schools in Australia, Catholic schools receive funding from the Commonwealth government. Church schools range from elite, high cost schools (which generally offer extensive bursary programs for low-income pupils) to low-fee local schools. Notable schools include the Jesuit colleges of Loyola College Watsonia, St Aloysius, Loyola Senior High School, Mount Druitt and Saint Ignatius' College, Riverview in Sydney, Saint Ignatius' College, Adelaide and Xavier College in Melbourne; the Marist Brothers St Joseph's College, Hunters Hill, and the Marist Brothers St Gregory's College, Campbelltown; the Society of the Sacred Heart's Rosebay Kincoppal School, the Institute of the Blessed Virgin Mary's Loreto Normanhurst and Loreto Kirribilli, the Sisters of Mercy's Monte Sant'Angelo Mercy College, the Christian Brothers' St Edmund's College, Canberra, Waverley College Sydney, St Kevin's College, Melbourne, St Mary MacKillop College, Canberra and Aquinas College, Perth; the list and range of Catholic primary and secondary schools in Australia is long and diverse and extends throughout metropolitan, regional and remote Australia: see Category:Catholic schools in Australia.

=== Administration and funding ===
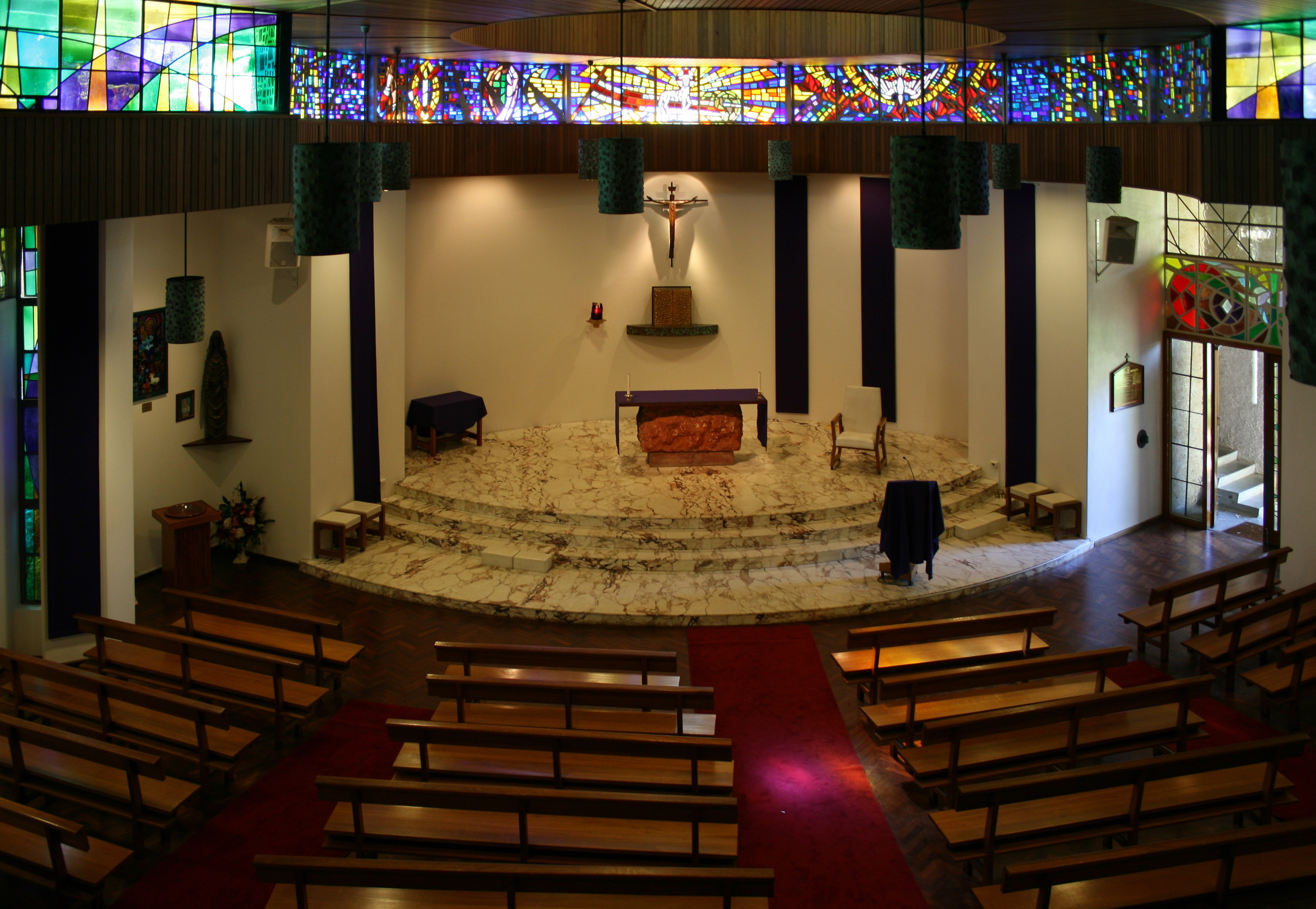
Aquinas College, Perth, chapel

In Australia, the state and territory governments have the primary responsibility for funding state government schools and also provide supplementary assistance to non-government schools. However, the Australian federal government is the primary source of public funding for non-government schools (while also providing supplementary assistance to government schools). These public funds subsidise the fees paid by parents for the education of their children at Catholic schools. These provide the overall effect of reducing the numbers and therefore burden on public funding for government schools. Most non-government schools have some religious affiliation, with approximately two-thirds of their pupils enrolled in Catholic schools. In the final year of secondary schooling, pupils at both government and non-government schools sit for a government-endorsed certificate that is recognised by all Australian universities and vocational education and training institutions. Thus, Catholic schools may freely teach and encourage religious studies, values and community engagement; and must adhere to the broader requirements of Australia's secular education system.

The National Catholic Education Commission (NCEC), established by the Australian Catholic Bishops' Conference through the Bishops Commission for Catholic Education, is tasked with maintaining liaison with the federal government and other key national education bodies and complements and supports the work of the state and territory Catholic education commissions. While some Catholic schools operate independently via religious institutes, the majority of Catholic schools, called systemic schools, operate under the canon law jurisdiction of an ecclesiastical public juridic person, such as a bishop. In practice, the bishop assigns a Catholic Education Office (CEO), Catholic Education Commission, Catholic Schools Offices, or a similar body with daily operational responsibility for the leadership, efficient operation, and management of the Catholic systemic schools which educate in parish primary and regional secondary schools in Australia. These diocesan bodies are charged with the implementation and management of the policies of the diocese and the allocation and administration of the funds provided by government and private sources to Catholic systemic schools, as well as the financial responsibilities for administration of salaries for staff members.

Many Catholic schools in Australia are connected to the Internet via Catholic Education Network (CEnet).

=== Ethos ===
While Catholic schools must adhere to the broad requirements of Australia's secular education system, they are free to provide a "Catholic" education ethos. The Catholic Education Office of Melbourne outlines this "ethos" as follows:

Religious education is at the centre of both the formal and informal Catholic school curriculum. Our schools are characterised by a high proportion of Catholic teachers and students, with a visible Catholic symbolic culture and active sacramental and liturgical practices. The values, ideals and challenges of the Gospel, embodied in the person of Jesus Christ, find explicit expression in the curriculum and ethos of Catholic schools, as do the teachings and traditions of the Catholic Church.

==== Catholic view of marriage ====
With curriculum changes flowing from possible outcomes of the Australian Marriage Law Postal Survey, the NCEC said, without seeing what was proposed, "it is impossible to ... ensure Catholic schools can continue to teach the Catholic view of marriage".

=== Alumni ===
Among the millions of Australians who have attended Catholic schools, many have been prominent in public life. In recent years these have included prime ministers Paul Keating, Kevin Rudd, and Tony Abbott, former governor-general Sir William Deane, former deputy prime minister Tim Fischer, the first woman elected to lead an Australian state or territory, Rosemary Follett and serving Lord Mayor of Sydney, Clover Moore. Current parliamentarians include Bill Shorten and Barnaby Joyce.

Prominent indigenous Australians include former senator Aden Ridgeway, Pat Dodson (the first Aboriginal person to become a Catholic priest in Australia), and his brother, Mick, and Kurtley Beale.

In the arts a large number of Catholic educated people have been prominent, from the father of Australian rock and roll, Johnny O'Keefe, to contemporary musicians such as Paul Kelly and Ignatius Jones. In film and television, Catholic educated Australians have included Mel Gibson, David Wenham, Julian Morrow, Antonia Kidman, Anh Do, Santo Cilauro and Tom Gleisner. Contemporary Australian writers who have attended Catholic schools include Robert Hughes, Morris West, Nick Enright, Justin Fleming and Gerard Windsor. Princess Michael of Kent, businesswomen Ita Buttrose, Gai Waterhouse and Lucy Turnbull all attended the Society of the Sacred Heart's Kincoppal School.

A former Chief Justice of the High Court of Australia, Murray Gleeson, attended St Joseph's College, Hunters Hill and his successor, Robert French, attended St. Louis School, Claremont, Western Australia. As of August 2011, a nine members of the 49 member New South Wales Supreme Court were former students of the Jesuit's St Ignatius' College Riverview. Former treasurer and now Ambassador of Australia to the United States, Joe Hockey received a Catholic education.

== Universities ==
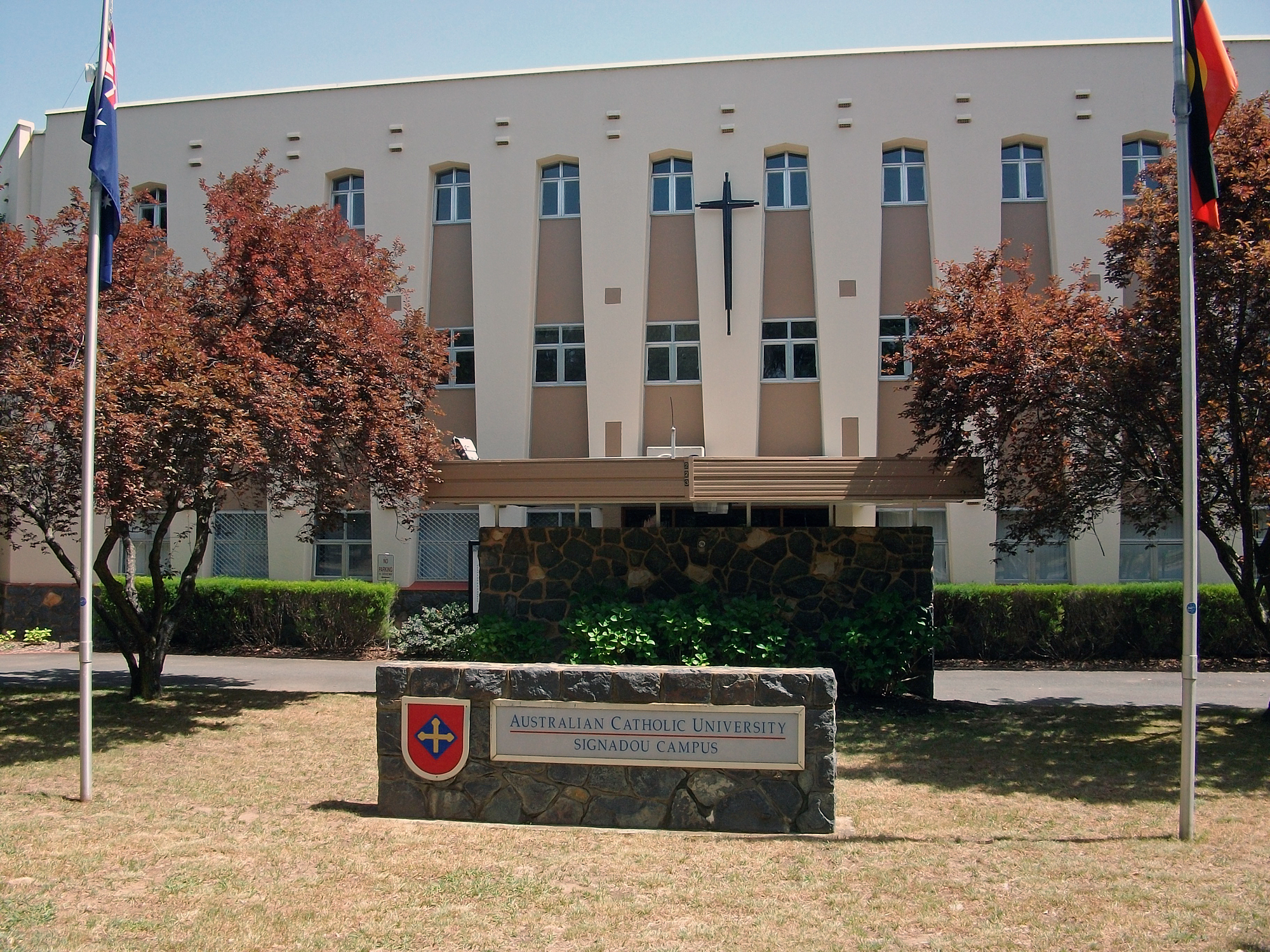
Australian Catholic University Signadou Campus in the Canberra suburb of Watson

The Australian Catholic University opened in 1991, following the amalgamation of four Catholic tertiary institutions in eastern Australia. These institutions had their origins in the 1800s, when religious orders and institutes became involved in preparing teachers for Catholic schools and nurses for Catholic hospitals.

The University of Notre Dame Australia opened in Western Australia in December 1989 and now has over 9,000 students on three campuses in Fremantle, Sydney and Broome.

Campion College, established in 2005, is a liberal arts college located in the suburbs of Sydney.

== See also ==
- Education in Australia
- Anglican education in Australia
- Catholic Social Services Australia
- Catholic Health Australia
