= Stone Bridge, Dalrymple Gap Track =

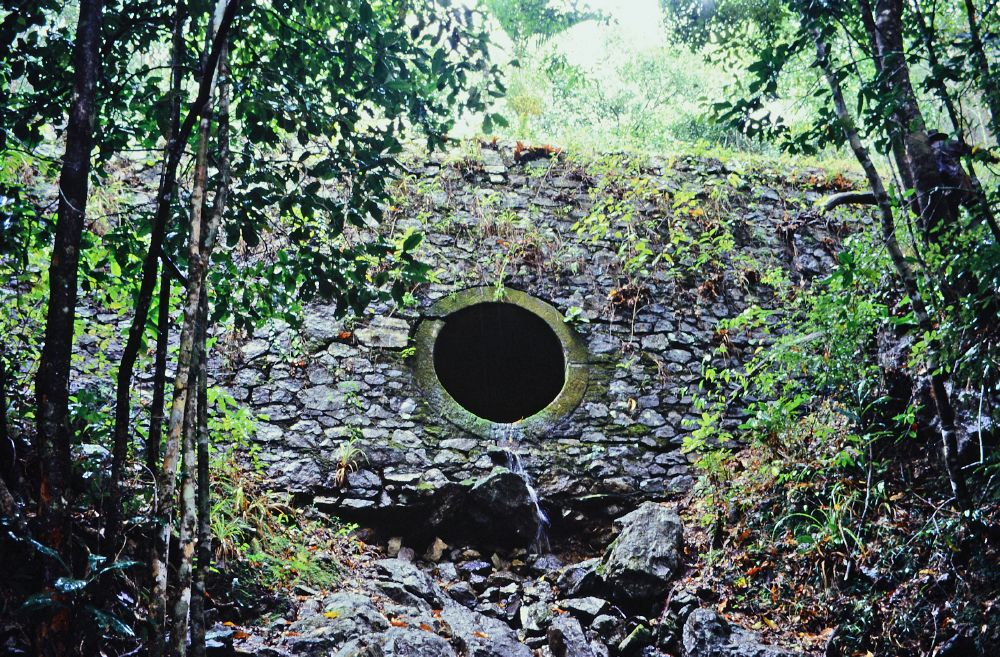
- Stone Bridge, Dalrymple Gap Track, lower side, 1993

- Location within Queensland Location within Australia
- 18.3995°S 146.0787°E
- Location: Valley of Lagoons Road, Damper Creek, Cassowary Coast Region, Queensland, Australia

History
- Design period: 1840s–1860s (mid-19th century)
- Built: 1864–1865

Queensland Heritage Register
- Official name: Stone Bridge, Dalrymple Gap Track
- Type: state heritage (built)
- Designated: 21 October 1992
- Reference no.: 600393
- Significant period: 1860s (fabric); 1865–1872 (historical main period of use of road)
- Significant components: embankment – road, culvert – stream

Stone Bridge, Dalrymple Gap Track is a heritage-listed road bridge at Valley of Lagoons Road, Damper Creek, Cassowary Coast Region, Queensland, Australia. It was built from 1864 to 1865. It was added to the Queensland Heritage Register on 21 October 1992.

== History ==
The stone and brick culvert near Dalrymple Gap, south of Damper Creek, was constructed in late 1864/early 1865, and is understood to have been part of the first major civil engineering work undertaken in North Queensland: the construction of the Dalrymple Gap Track linking Cardwell to its hinterland and the Valley of Lagoons on the upper Burdekin River.

In 1863, explorer George Elphinstone Dalrymple, in partnership with Arthur and Walter Scott, had taken up the Valley of Lagoons run, which was separated from the coast by two densely forested mountain ranges – the eastern range now known as Cardwell Range, and the inner Seaview Range. Early in 1864 Dalrymple, with Queensland Government sanction though not funding, sailed from Port Denison (Bowen) to Rockingham Bay/Port Hinchinbrook, where he established a settlement to be named Cardwell, then turned his attention to finding a dray route west to the interior and the Valley of Lagoons. After an initial unsuccessful attempt to penetrate the Cardwell Range near Meunga Creek, Dalrymple discovered an Aboriginal path leading directly to what became known as Dalrymple Gap, between Mount Leach and Mount Arthur Scott, about 10 miles (16 km) south of the settlement at Port Hinchinbrook. Beyond lay the Herbert River valley, and beyond this the Seaview Range, which was crossed with considerable difficulty to reach the Valley of Lagoons on the Burdekin. On their return journey, Dalrymple's party cleared, and in parts formed, a rough dray track to the coast.

In the second half of 1864, the Queensland government allocated £2,000 to fund further work on the road. In late 1864, a government road party was dispatched to Cardwell. On arrival, Dalrymple proceeded with Mr Conlan, the road party overseer, to mark out the route to be formed through Dalrymple's Gap to the Vale of Herbert station, reducing the length of road from 36 to 28 miles (58 to 45 km). Mr Conlan and party then worked on the ascent of Dalrymple Gap on the coast side. The western side of the route was let out in three sections, each of 1.5 miles (2.4 km), to hasten completion of the project.

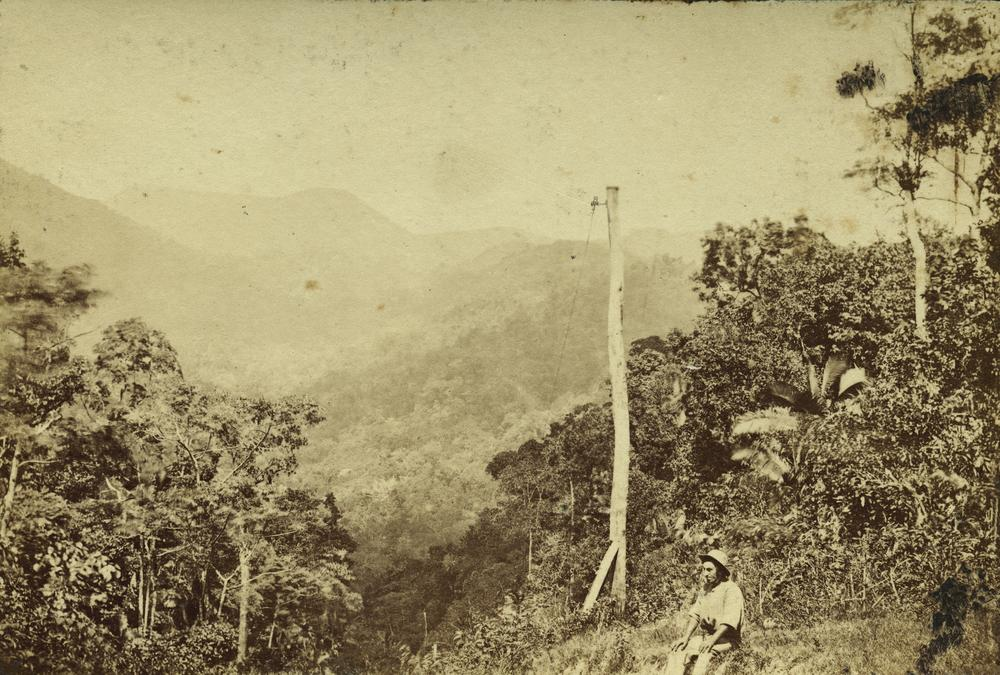
Dalrymple Gap near Cardwell, 1874

By 20 January 1865, the government road party had completed a road of easy gradient from the bottom to the top of the pass on the coast side. It is probable that the bridge was constructed during this period, because Dalrymple reported in a letter of 22 February 1865 that work on the road would be completed by the end of March, including the felling of timber, removal of obstructions, and crossings of creeks made, including the construction of " substantial culverts" where necessary.

The Dalrymple Gap Track had its heaviest use in the period 1864–1872. In the late 1860s and early 1870s pastoralists and sugar-growers took up the Herbert River valley, and by early 1871 nearly 100 people were resident on the Herbert. A bridle track was found from the Herbert to Cardwell via Cardwell Gap (then Victoria Pass), which subsequently was formed into a dray road. After this opened in October 1872 there was little need for the much steeper route over Dalrymple Gap, although Cardwell Divisional Board funded occasional maintenance work until the early 1890s.

The Queensland Forest Service has managed the Dalrymple Gap Track since 1987. Most of the track, including the stone bridge/culvert, was included within the Lumholtz National Park (now the Girrigun National Park) gazetted in 1992. It remains a popular bushwalking track. The bridge underwent conservation work in 2001.

== Description ==
The bridge is on the eastern side of Cardwell Range, approximately 200 metres (660 ft) from Dalrymple's Gap, on the old road between Cardwell and the Valley of Lagoons. It traverses the deep, narrow valley of Damper Creek at about the 300-metre (980 ft) contour. It is a brick-lined culvert set in a stonework embankment.

The embankment is about 6 metres (20 ft) wide at the road surface, 20 metres (66 ft) long, and 5.5 metres (18 ft) high on the upstream side and 7 metres (23 ft) high on the downstream side. It is constructed of stone rubble and soft mortar, and has a single circular conduit of about 1.5 metres (4 ft 11 in) in diameter to carry water under the roadway during the wet season. This conduit is lined with a double layer of bricks.

== Heritage listing ==
Stone Bridge, Dalrymple Gap Track was listed on the Queensland Heritage Register on 21 October 1992 having satisfied the following criteria.

The place is important in demonstrating the evolution or pattern of Queensland's history.

The Stone Bridge, a culvert on the early dray road over Dalrymple's Gap, is important in illustrating the early development of this area in the mid-1860s when the connection of pastoral properties on the Tableland with the coast and the establishment of a port were vital to permit development. The bridge has an association with the life and work of George Dalrymple an early explorer in North Queensland.

The place demonstrates rare, uncommon or endangered aspects of Queensland's cultural heritage.

It is rare as the oldest remaining stone bridge/culvert in Queensland and the earliest surviving civil engineering work in mainland North Queensland.

The place is important in demonstrating the principal characteristics of a particular class of cultural places.

The bridge remains substantially intact, and is an excellent example of mid-19th century culvert construction in difficult terrain.

The place is important because of its aesthetic significance.

The place has aesthetic value, and the picturesque scenery made accessible to the visitor by the establishment of the road in 1864–65, has been admired since the earliest days of European settlement, being a popular site for picnics in the 1870s.
