= Row of Street Trees, Halifax =

Row of Street Trees
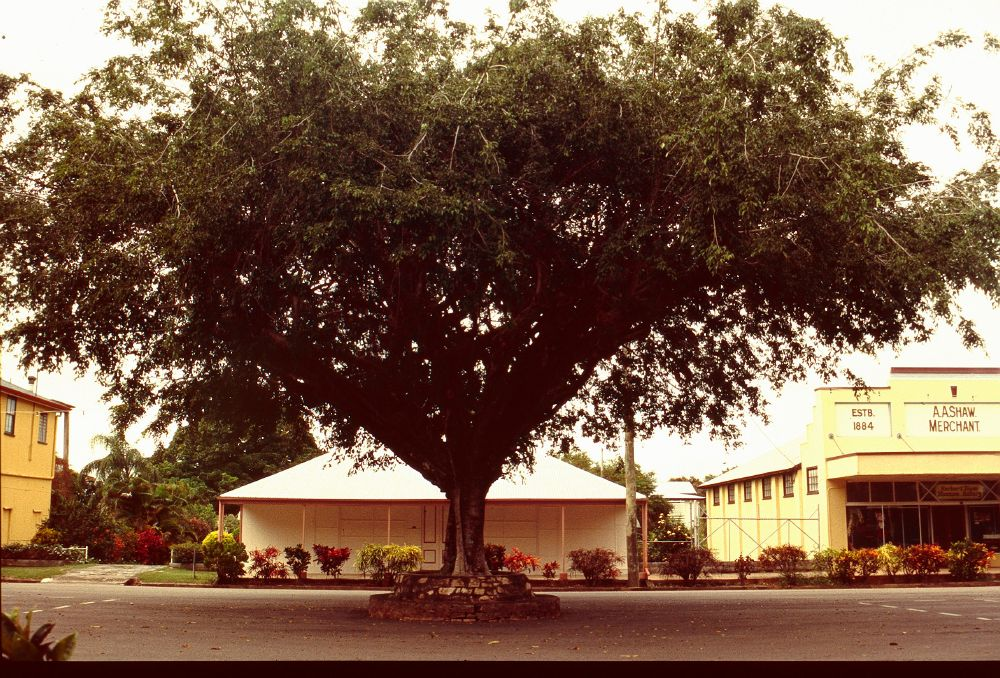
- Row of Street Trees, 2003

- Location within Queensland Location within Australia
- 18.5808°S 146.2847°E
- Location: Macrossan Street, Halifax, Shire of Hinchinbrook, Queensland, Australia

History
- Design period: 1870s–1890s (late 19th century)
- Built: c. 1885

Queensland Heritage Register
- Official name: Row of Street Trees
- Type: state heritage (landscape)
- Designated: 6 September 2003
- Reference no.: 602349
- Significant period: c. 1885 (historical)
- Significant components: seating

Row of Street Trees is a heritage-listed avenue of trees at Macrossan Street, Halifax, Shire of Hinchinbrook, Queensland, Australia. The trees were planted c. 1885. The trees were added to the Queensland Heritage Register on 6 September 2003.

== History ==
In the mid-1880s members of the small community of Halifax planted a row of mango trees along Macrossan Street, the emerging hub of the new township. The trees were planted as part of a broader public works program in Halifax initiated during the 1880s by six prominent settlers: Harald Hoffensetz, August Anderssen, Austin W Carr, Niels C Rosendahl, John Alm and Francis Herron, who constructed local roads, a church and school using volunteered time and money. These settlers also contributed to the economic stability of the township and promoted the district and the community at every opportunity. The mango trees are probably the last remaining stand of trees associated with this public improvement program, which at one time may have extended to other parts of Halifax.

In 1864 an official exploration party headed by George Elphinstone Dalrymple, Government Surveyor and Government Lands Commissioner, travelled from Port Hinchinbrook (now Cardwell) to the Valley of Lagoons Station and opened the Herbert River district for selection. In 1867, John Davidson explored the lower end of the Herbert River Valley and three years later settlers were beginning to trickle into the district. In 1873 there were three sugar plantations established: Gairloch, Macknade and Bemerside. They all had separate mills and the lower Herbert District was developing into individual communities with the first sugar crush at Macknade in 1874. The founder of Halifax, August Andersson, arrived in Bowen with his wife Eva from Hamburg in August 1872 and they quickly made their way to the Herbert River district. Andersson was employed on the Macknade Plantation as a carpenter but later worked on the construction of the nearby Ripple Creek Sugar Mill. Andersson continued working at the Macknade Sugar Mill until 1879 when he moved up to the Gairloch Plantation and set up a shop near the Planters Retreat Hotel which was halfway between Gairloch and Ingham. It was here that he opened a successful blacksmith business which enabled him to purchase land downstream in 1880, which would later become Halifax.

In 1880, convinced of its possibilities, August Anderssen and Francis Herron made an exploratory survey of the lower Herbert Region before heading off to Cardwell to approach the Land Agent to stake a selection. A small land rush ensued, marking the beginning of an area noted for its small farm settlement, distinct from large plantations. Anderssen purchased 360 acres (portion 228) and a year later purchased the adjoining block (portion 270), but later that year sold part of it to the Colonial Sugar Refining Company (CSR). The company proceeded to build a wharf there to service their Victoria Plantation nearby. At this stage sugar would be loaded at the Halifax wharf, which was an important terminus for Herbert River traffic, and then taken downstream by boat to the deepwater Port of Dungeness at the mouth of the Herbert River. At around the same time that the Anderssen family moved down to their property, so too did nine other families. They occupied an area of approximately 2,200 acres comprising ten selections, which became known as Black's Township. In 1881 Copnell built the first hotel on Anderssen's Riverview estate. It was established on an area of Anderssen's estate which would later become the present Halifax and was quickly joined by a store built by Eugene Regazzoli who purchased a portion of Anderssen's land. This store serviced the fledgling community.

The six main Black's Township settlers decided to form a company to negotiate with CSR to supply the Victoria Mill with cane. They called themselves the Herbert River Farmers Association and included: Harald Hoffensetz, August Anderssen, Austin W Carr, Niels C Rosendahl, John Alm, and Francis Herron. These men were forerunners of the small farm and central mill system which would characterize the sugar industry. They also put a lot of effort into improving their district. For example, in 1883 they approached the Hinchinbrook Divisional Board for a road to be made from the wharf to Cordelia Vale. This would then provide an important service link with Ingham. When the Divisional Board was unwilling to commit funds to the project the Herbert River Farmers Association cleared a track to Cordelia Vale themselves.

By now most of the six families had been in the district for nearly ten years. They met every Saturday nearest the full moon with the men conducting the Herbert River Farmers Association meetings and the women enjoying the social opportunity to meet together. It is not surprising that in 1883 the community lobbied the Queensland Government for a school. A provisional school was approved for the area only on the condition that the community provide teacher accommodation and a schoolroom. The Association decided to contribute all work on a voluntary basis with Anderssen, Hoffensetz, and John Alm constructing the building out of hardwood. In September 1883, a school for 17 local children commenced. The men in the Herbert River Farmers Association were dedicated to the welfare and progress of their community and were instrumental in the development of the settlement which would later become the township of Halifax.

Halifax began as a township in 1885 when Anderssen decided to utilize unused portions of his land and engaged a local surveyor to subdivide his land into township allotments and roads. He engaged a Townsville auctioneer and they started an active and successful promotion campaign which attracted many people including over 300 who came from Townsville. Anderssen's Town became the envy of the nearby town of Ingham and appeared ready to surpass Ingham as the major town in the district. The nucleus of a township was already established; it had a hotel, a store, a wharf and a tramline. In addition the new town was in the vicinity of three major plantations and mills: Ripple Creek, Macknade, and Victoria, so its future appeared secure. This sale produced immediate capital gains for the two businesses already established, and Copnell sold the hotel to CF Robinson and it later became the Halifax Hotel. Initially regarded as Lower Herbert, it was not until 1886 that the settlement was officially named Halifax after the nearby Halifax Bay, named in 1770 by Captain Cook. With the formation of a township secure, the community turned to the establishment of a church.

The Halifax community set about building its own church using volunteer labour. Again key settlers Anderssen and Hoffensetz designed and supervised the building project and it was completed in 1886. It is most likely during this initial period of community building that the mango trees were planted in the main street of the new town as part of a beautification program. A grandson of Niels C Rosendahl claims his grandfather planted them. While many communities in North Queensland during the settling period planted Fig trees (Ficus spp.) in public places the settlers of Halifax planted mango trees (Mangifera indica) which were considered practical, as they were fruit bearing trees and much valued for their shade.

By the 1890s when much of colonial Queensland was suffering crippling economic depression, the Lower Herbert district was booming. Rather than large settlers starting plantations, there was a general move to small individually owned farms bolstered by the completion of the Victoria to Halifax tramline in 1890. It enjoyed a culturally diverse population including a large population of South Pacific Islanders, brought in as indentured labour to work on the sugar plantations, and Chinese who worked on the CSR tramline to Lucinda.

In response to the banning of "coloured labour" in 1891 a Townsville businessman recruited Italian workers to fill the labour shortage left when Pacific Islanders were repatriated to their islands. This initiated a chain migration pattern and many of these Italian immigrants settled around Halifax. Halifax was fast becoming the centre of the district, rivalling Ingham as the main commercial centre.

However the town did not fulfil its promise. Progressive silting of the Herbert River made the river too shallow for many vessels, and an alternative transportation method for the sugar industry was sought. In 1896 the CSR Company built a tramway through the mangroves to a newly established deep-water port at Lucinda. With the tramway now extending from Ingham to Lucinda and the usage of waterways in decline, Halifax ceased to function as a service centre for the sugar industry.

By 1900, the mango trees in Macrossan Street were large and kept well trimmed by the community, providing welcome shade for the hotel patrons against the tropical heat. A c. 1900 photograph indicates that the trees were pruned to promote upward growth and possibly to extend the spread of the canopy to maximise the shade potential. In 1904, the usefulness and beauty of the Mango trees was noted in a local newspaper:

Strangers, sighting Halifax for the first time cannot fail to be struck with the natural advantage of the town, although the greater part of it has not been built on the orthodox Government surveyed line. The tramway runs down the centre, or thereabouts, of the main street, and a nicely planted, uniform row of mango trees gives excellent shade. This umbrageous ornamentation is something to be proud of and it makes one wonder why that "one of the best shade trees" has been so persistently ignored in school grounds and other public places in North Queensland.

At the turn of the 20th century increasing arrivals of Italian workers invigorated the Lower Herbert District, with many later buying their own farms and bringing their families out from Italy. Again the mango trees in Macrossan Street provided a social meeting venue for the new immigrants, who regularly met under the shady canopies. Older members of the Italian community maintained this tradition for well over 50 years. They are also remembered for displaying extreme pride in their meeting place, sweeping the street clean and free of leaves and mangoes before settling down on the benches installed around the base for lively discussions. These benches were extant by the mid-20th century. Younger members of the community also found a welcome social spot under the mango trees. In the 1950s, after a Saturday night party at the Dance Hall situated between the two hotels, young men and women would spill out onto the street to congregate under the trees before heading home.

When removal of the trees was proposed in late 2001 the community organised a protest petition to be sent to the Hinchinbrook Shire Council which was signed by over 800 people from Halifax and surrounding districts, including Cordelia, Taylors Beach, Lucinda and Ingham.

In 2003, nearly one hundred and twenty years after they were planted, the Mango trees in Halifax continue to fulfill the role intended by the community who planted them. They are a welcome source of shade against the tropical sun and provide natural character and beauty to the town of Halifax. As Halifax is located on an emerging tourist route the aesthetic quality of the trees in the town's overall character is highly valued and is perceived to contribute to the local economy.

== Description ==
The row of trees, comprising eight Mango trees (Mangifera indica), a weeping fig (Ficus benjamina), and an African Mahogany (Khaya spp.) are situated in Macrossan Street, the main street of Halifax, in the block between Alma Street at the northern end and River Avenue at the southern end. The trees are planted down the centre of the street at approximately 25-metre (82 ft) intervals over a length of 255 metres (837 ft).

The Mango trees have an average trunk circumference of 4.1 metres (13 ft) but each tree has its own character with trunks gnarled and burled in different patterns. The largest circumference is 5.15 metres (16.9 ft) with the smallest circumference measuring 2.75 metres (9 ft 0 in). The average height of the trunk up to the first major fork in the tree is 3.62 metres (11.9 ft) but varies from tree to tree, the tallest measuring 5.05 metres (16.6 ft) and the shortest 2.79 metres (9 ft 2 in). The average total height of the Mango trees measured (by use of a clinometer) was 20.20 metres (66.3 ft); however these figures are approximate because of the difficulty in accurately sighting the top of each tree.

The shade of each mango tree extends to an average area average of 132 square metres (1,420 sq ft) providing a welcome shade source in summer. This shade extends over the western side of the street where the majority of the shops and the two hotels are located.

The canopy circumference is comparable to the root ball. It is estimated that the depth of the root ball extends at least 18 metres (59 ft) below the surface of the road reserve and quite possibly interlinks at many points at the tips. Their size and height is not only due to their age but also due to the availability of the water table which is approximately 2 metres (6 ft 7 in) below the surface. The tree roots provide an excellent structure to bind the soil and decrease erosion, a major problem in a wet area like the Herbert. The surrounding road surface, which extends right up to the base of the trees, is sealed with bitumen.

There have been some changes in the composition of the row of trees. One mango tree has been replaced with a weeping fig (Ficus benjamina), to ensure that the aesthetic and shade qualities enjoyed by the community would remain. This is the only tree in the row to retain a circular concrete bench seat around its base. All of the mango trees used to have these benches, which have since been removed. There is also a more recent African Mahogany (Khaya spp.) which appears to have been planted in place of a mango tree.

== Heritage listing ==
The Row of Street Trees in Halifax was listed on the Queensland Heritage Register on 6 September 2003 having satisfied the following criteria.

The place is important in demonstrating the evolution or pattern of Queensland's history.

The Row of Street Trees in Macrossan Street, Halifax, comprises eight mature Mango Trees (Mangifera indica), a weeping fig (Ficus benjamina) and an African Mahogany (Khaya spp.). The row is significant to the local and Queensland community for its historical, aesthetic and social qualities. The Mango trees are thought to have been planted c. 1885-86 as shade trees to help Europeans adjust to the tropics and as part of a beautification program, using introduced species as was common then. The Mango trees are important in demonstrating the evolution or pattern of Queensland's history, being associated with the earliest establishment of the township of Halifax on the Herbert River in the 1880s, and with the role of the Herbert River Farmers' Association in developing the town and district.

The place is important in demonstrating the principal characteristics of a particular class of cultural places.

They are an excellent surviving example of late 19th century shade trees planted in public spaces, particularly interesting for the choice of Mango trees (Mangifera indica), which are both fruit-bearing and much valued for their shade, rather than the more usual Fig trees (Ficus spp.).

The place is important because of its aesthetic significance.

The trees have become part of the community life of Halifax as shady meeting places in the area of the town, particularly for the elderly, and are valued by the locals throughout the district and by visitors for their aesthetic qualities. The trees are important for their aesthetic value. Halifax is distinctive for its avenue of trees and the aesthetic qualities they project. Visitors to the town remember the Mango trees in particular for their size, height and beauty; being all approximately 20 metres (66 ft) in height, possessing gnarled trunks, and planted at a uniform distance. The trees are a significant physical feature of the Macrossan Street streetscape and contribute significantly to the character of Halifax.

The place has a strong or special association with a particular community or cultural group for social, cultural or spiritual reasons.

The trees have become part of the community life of Halifax as shady meeting places in the area of the town, particularly for the elderly, and are valued by the locals throughout the district and by visitors for their aesthetic qualities. The trees have been an integral part of each stage of community development in Halifax, and have a strong and special association with the local community as a meeting place. At one period a concrete seating bench was constructed around the base of each tree. One Mango tree, dubbed the "Tree of Knowledge", remains a favourite meeting place for older Italian men who have regularly met friends there over a period of fifty years. The trees are also fondly remembered as the place for younger members of the community to meet friends on a Saturday night. The community has always taken pride in Macrossan Street and its trees and the current Halifax community feels a strong and special association with them. When removal of the trees was proposed in late 2001 the community organised a protest petition to be sent to the Hinchinbrook Shire Council which was signed by over 800 people from Halifax and surrounding districts, including Cordelia, Taylors Beach, Lucinda and Ingham.
