= Gairloch Bridge =

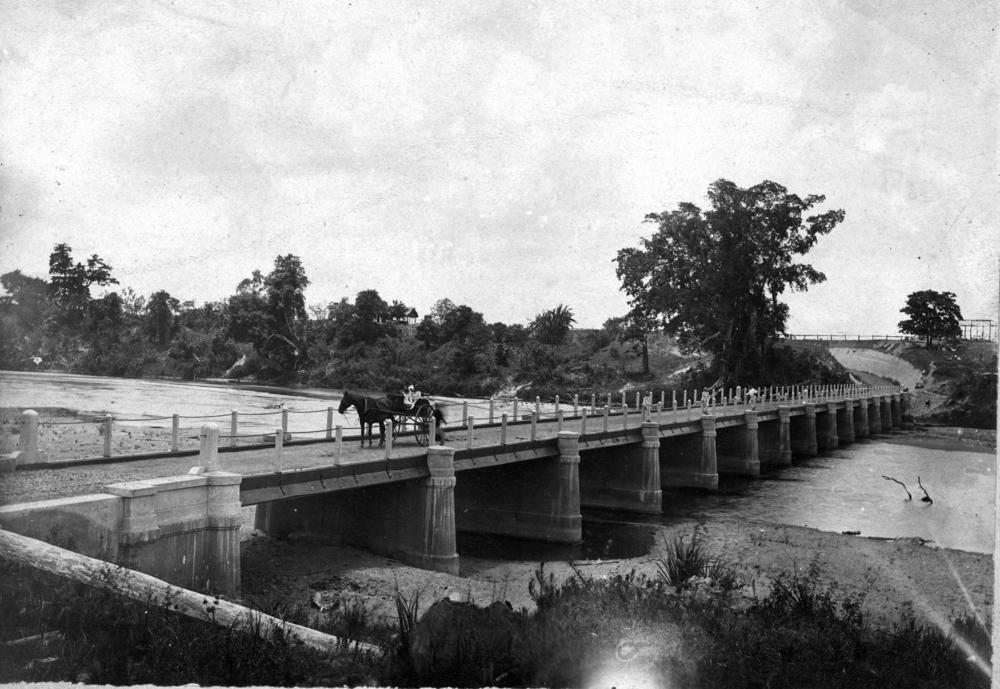
- Gairloch Bridge, circa 1890

- Location within Queensland Location within Australia
- 18.6167°S 146.1837°E
- Location: on the Old Bruce Highway over the Herbert River between Foresethome and Gairloch, near Ingham, Shire of Hinchinbrook, Queensland, Australia

History
- Design period: 1870s–1890s (late 19th century)
- Built: 1890–1891

Site notes
- Architect: Alfred Barton Brady

Queensland Heritage Register
- Official name: Gairloch Bridge
- Type: state heritage (built)
- Designated: 17 July 2008
- Reference no.: 602591
- Significant period: 1890–2008
- Significant components: pier/s (bridge), abutments – road bridge, road/roadway
- Builders: James Graham

Gairloch Bridge is a heritage-listed road bridge on the Old Bruce Highway over the Herbert River between Foresthome and Gairloch, near Ingham in the Shire of Hinchinbrook, Queensland, Australia. It was designed by Alfred Barton Brady and built from 1890 to 1891 by James Graham. It was added to the Queensland Heritage Register on 17 July 2008.

== History ==
The Gairloch Bridge is a low level road bridge across the lower Herbert River near Ingham in North Queensland. Completed in November 1891, it was an innovative design by the prominent Queensland Government Architect and bridge engineer, Alfred Barton Brady.

The Herbert River valley was first occupied by pastoralists in the mid-1860s. Sugarcane farming, now the dominant industry in the area, commenced during the early 1870s. By the late 1880s, the Ingham area had become one of Queensland's top sugar producers with some five mills operating in the Herbert River district.

From as early as 1885 the Hinchinbrook Divisional Board and residents of the area called for the Queensland Government to construct a bridge across the Herbert River to improve access for growers on the north side of the river to the region's seaport south of the river mouth at Dungeness. Unsuccessful in persuading the government to fund the construction, the board decided to raise the finance itself, and in June 1888 asked the Government Engineer for Bridges to prepare plans for the bridge.

The bridge was designed by Alfred Barton Brady, an English-born civil engineer and architect who migrated to Australia in 1884. From 1885 he held a position as Assistant Engineer for Bridges with the Railways Department in Queensland before being appointed Acting Engineer for Bridges in the Department of Mines and Works in June 1889. In the Department of Mines and Works and its successor departments, Brady had a distinguished career rising to the position of Government Architect and Engineer of Bridges in 1892 and Undersecretary in 1901. He held this position until his retirement in 1922.

The contract for construction of the bridge was awarded to James Graham of South Brisbane who commenced work early in 1890. Following a number of delays, partly caused by the frequent flooding of the river, the bridge was completed at a cost of £7,737 and opened for traffic on 4 November 1891.

The Gairloch Bridge was the first road bridge designed by Brady as Engineer for Bridges in the Department of Mines and Works. Other bridges designed by him included the Burnett River Bridge at Bundaberg, Victoria Bridge in Brisbane (no longer extant), and the Lamington Bridge in Maryborough (1896). The Lamington Bridge was a Wunsch-system structure of reinforced concrete, the first such design in Australia.

The bridge at Gairloch, which pre-dates the Lamington Bridge by five years, demonstrates one of the earliest uses of concrete in bridge construction in Queensland. Prior to the introduction of reinforced concrete to Australia in the 1890s, concrete as a component of bridges took the form of un-reinforced abutments, piers and mass concrete culverts, the earliest known being railway culverts constructed in South Australia in 1878. In 1882, concrete culverts were used on the Warwick-to-Stanthorpe railway line in Queensland. The original bridge across the railway in Edward Street Brisbane, designed by FDG Stanley in 1887 had concrete abutments. The concrete piers and abutments of the Gairloch Bridge, designed in 1889, are among the earliest known in Queensland. From c. 1890, the greater availability of locally made Portland cement made the use of this material in bridge construction much more common.

The Gairloch Bridge is a submersible bridge designed to withstand inundation during major floods. It is the first submersible road bridge known to have been designed by Brady who is recognised for his important contributions to the development of this type of bridge. The shorter, submersible bridges were a cost-effective alternative to designing longer bridges above major flood levels, which often inundated a considerable area either side of the river. The principal difficulty of submersible bridges was that debris accumulated against the bridge during floods and this, in combination with the force exerted by the water, could cause major damage. Brady developed designs to avoid trapping debris and to present the least possible obstruction to the flow of flood waters. To date, it remains common practice to design less important bridges to withstand flood submergence.

The Gairloch Bridge incorporated a number of features that were innovative at the time. For the decking, Brady used 33-foot (10 m) lengths of steel trough plate, 12 inches (300 mm) deep, riveted together and securely bolted down to the concrete string-courses. The troughs were then filled with tarred metal. The curbs and posts were of hardwood. Brady argued that this design had important advantages in flood conditions due to its greater weight and because the steel troughs eliminated the need for girders, the bridge offered less resistance to the flow of flood waters. This design option was more costly than a bridge using the more conventional timber decking and superstructure, but Brady argued that the maintenance cost of his design would be less. The Gairloch Bridge is the only known road bridge of this design in Queensland.

Against the expectations of its designer, the bridge did not perform well initially. On 11 June 1892, The Queenslander reported that it required "rather a large amount of money to keep it in repair". A major flood in 1894 resulted in two sections of iron troughing being lifted and doubled over by the force of the flood. This necessitated the complete renewal of the roadway with layers of concrete and tarred metal. Then, in 1927, a record flood completely destroyed the northern approach to the bridge. In 1929, the bridge roadway was resurfaced and the hardwood curbing was replaced with concrete.

The inconvenience incurred by the periodic inundation of the bridge eventually prompted the construction of two high-level bridges across the lower Herbert River: one linking Halifax with Macknade and Ripple Creek in 1927; and in the late 1960s another was built upstream from the Gairloch Bridge. Despite its early set-backs, the 1891 low-level bridge has survived in the long-term and this has been attributed to its innovative design, which presents a small obstruction to flood flow. The bridge continues to be used.

== Description ==
The Gairloch Bridge is a low level concrete bridge. It is simple and unadorned in appearance with no posts or balustrades.

The superstructure has the appearance of a shallow concrete slab about 5.7 metres (19 ft) wide. The roadway atop this slab is edged with concrete curbing and covered with worn bitumen. At each end of the bridge, there is a pair of reflective guide posts fixed into the curb, one on each side of the road. The steel plates that make up the base of the superstructure are clearly visible on its underside.

Fourteen concrete pillars support the superstructure. These taper slightly from a wide base and are curved in cross-section in the direction of water flow. There is a wide raised band around the base of each pillar and a narrow band around the top. The cement that is an element of the pillars has eroded, exposing the pebbles that form part of the concrete's composition.

At the southern end of the bridge, the road passes through a deep cutting. The sides of the cutting are lined with sections of brick, stonework or loose rocks. Some of the stonework and bricks are coated with cement.

The bridge crosses the Herbert River at a point where, for most of the year, it is wide but quite shallow. Dense vegetation covers the river banks at either end of the bridge.

== Heritage listing ==
Gairloch Bridge was listed on the Queensland Heritage Register on 17 July 2008 having satisfied the following criteria.

The place is important in demonstrating the evolution or pattern of Queensland's history.

Gairloch Bridge, constructed in 1890–1891, is important in demonstrating the pattern of settlement in North Queensland in the late nineteenth century. By the late 1880s, the Herbert River valley was one of Queensland's most important sugar producing areas. As the first bridge across the lower Herbert River, built to provide access to the region's port for growers on the north side of the river, the Gairloch Bridge is closely associated with the establishment of this important industry in northern Queensland.

As an early, experimental submersible bridge, the Gairloch Bridge is important in demonstrating the evolution of bridge design in Queensland and exemplifies how the colonial authorities responsible for bridge building responded to the extreme conditions of the north Queensland wet season. Submersible bridges evolved as a cost-effective solution to the problem of bridging rivers that were seasonally subject to extreme flooding, and remain common in Queensland.

As one of the state's earliest extant bridges incorporating concrete, the bridge also demonstrates the evolution of the use concrete in bridge construction in Queensland. The Gairloch Bridge is an example of the earliest use of concrete, where it was restricted to applications requiring only compressive strength such as piers and abutments. The introduction to Queensland of reinforced concrete a few years after the bridge was built broadened the applications of concrete to include components requiring tensile strength.

The place is important in demonstrating the principal characteristics of a particular class of cultural places.

The Gairloch Bridge is important in demonstrating the principal characteristics of submersible bridges: it is a low level bridge, crossing only the main channel of the river, and is designed to present the least possible obstruction to flood waters and debris.

The bridge is also important as the earliest known example in Queensland of a road bridge designed by the notable architect and engineer, AB Brady. The bridge was designed soon after his appointment as Engineer of Bridges in the Department of Mines and Works. Other important bridges designed by Brady include the third Victoria Bridge in Brisbane (no longer extant) and the Lamington Bridge in Maryborough (1896, Lamington Bridge).

The place is important in demonstrating a high degree of creative or technical achievement at a particular period.

The Gairloch Bridge is important in demonstrating a high degree of technical innovation for its time. The key design feature of the bridge is its superstructure. Steel troughs were placed longitudinally on concrete piers to form the decking of the bridge while at the same time acting as structural members. This eliminated the need for girders, thereby reducing obstruction to flood borne debris. The design is also innovative for its early use of concrete in the piers, abutments and string courses.

== Engineering heritage ==
The bridge received an Engineering Heritage Marker from Engineers Australia as part of its Engineering Heritage Recognition Program.
