= Foresthome =

- Suburb
- Interactive map of Foresthome
- Coordinates: 18.6113°S 146.2052°E
- Country: Australia
- State: Queensland
- LGA: Shire of Hinchinbrook
- Location: 7.3 km (4.5 mi) NE of Ingham; 119 km (74 mi) NW of Townsville; 240 km (150 mi) S of Cairns; 1,468 km (912 mi) NNW of Brisbane

Government
  - State electorate: Hinchinbrook
  - Federal division: Kennedy

Area
  - Total: 17.2 km^{2} (6.6 sq mi)

Population
  - Total: 84 (2021 census)
  - Density: 4.88/km^{2} (12.65/sq mi)
- Time zone: UTC+10:00 (AEST)
- Postcode: 4850
Suburbs around Foresthome
Gairloch	Gairloch	Bemerside
Gairloch	Foresthome	Cordelia
Ingham	Victoria Plantation	Victoria Plantation

Foresthome is a rural locality in the Shire of Hinchinbrook, Queensland, Australia. In the 2021 census, Foresthome had a population of 84 people.

== Geography ==
The North Coast railway line enters the locality from the south and exits to the north. There are two railway stations on the line in the locality, but both are now abandoned:

- Gairlock railway station (18.6282°S 146.1815°E)
- Lilypond railway station (18.5915°S 146.2154°E)

== History ==
Foresthome State School opened on 26 November 1935 with over 40 students. It closed on 15 March 1993. It was at 571 Halifax Road (18.60682°S 146.20223°E). As at 2022, the school sign remains extant on the site.

== Demographics ==
In the 2016 census, Foresthome had a population of 87 people.

In the 2021 census, Foresthome had a population of 84 people.

== Heritage listings ==
Foresthome has a number of heritage-listed sites, including:

- Gairloch Bridge, Old Bruce Highway between Foresthome and Gairloch

== Education ==
There are no schools in Foresthome. The nearest government primary schools are Victoria Plantation State School in neighbouring Victoria Plantation to the south and Halifax State School in Halifax to the north-east. The nearest government secondary school is Ingham State High School in neighbouring Ingham to the south-west.
