= Gairloch (disambiguation) =

Gairloch is a village and sea-loch on the north-west coast of Scotland.

Gairloch may also refer to:

- Gairloch, Queensland, a locality on the Bruce Highway in the Shire of Hinchinbrook, Australia
- Gairloch Bridge, a heritage-listed road bridge over the Herbert River near Ingham in Queensland, Australia

== See also ==
- Gair Loch, a sea-loch on the north-west coast of Scotland
- Gair Loch, a river loch on the Seaforth River in New Zealand
- Gare Loch, a sea-loch in Argyle and Bute, Scotland
- Gairlochy, a hamlet in the North West Highlands of Scotland
- Lochgair, a village on the north-western shore of Loch Fyne, Scotland
- New Gairlock, Nova Scotia, a community in the province of Nova Scotia, Canada
