= Muralambeen Homestead =

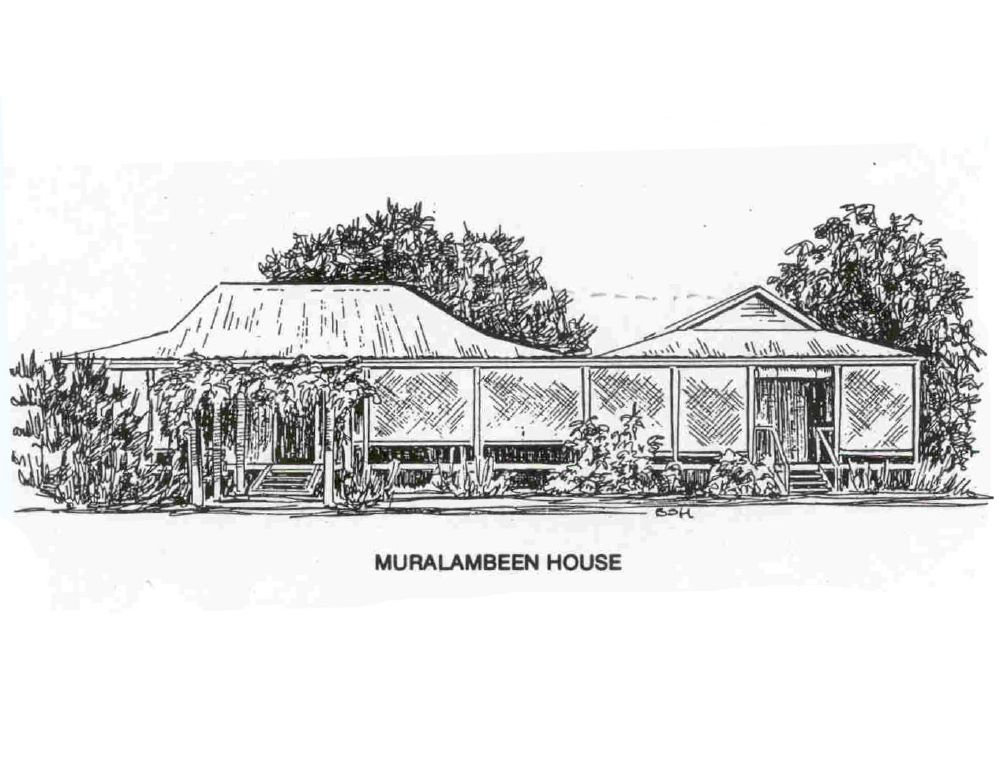
- Muralambeen Homestead sketch

- Location within Queensland Location within Australia
- 18.6976°S 146.238°E
- Location: Off Bosworth's Road, Forrest Beach, Shire of Hinchinbrook, Queensland, Australia

History
- Design period: 1870s - 1890s (late 19th century)
- Built: c. 1881 - c. 1900

Site notes
- Architectural style: Classicism

Queensland Heritage Register
- Official name: Muralambeen Homestead
- Type: state heritage (landscape, built)
- Designated: 25 February 2005
- Reference no.: 602362
- Significant period: 1870s-1880s (historical); 1880s-1900s (fabric)
- Significant components: residential accommodation - main house, garden/grounds

Muralambeen Homestead is a heritage-listed homestead off Bosworth's Road, Forrest Beach, Shire of Hinchinbrook, Queensland, Australia. It was built from c. 1881 to c. 1900. It was added to the Queensland Heritage Register on 25 February 2005.

== History ==
Muralambeen Homestead is located on Bosworth Road in Forrest Beach, 8 miles (13 km) south-east of Ingham on the Herbert River flood plains in the Kennedy pastoral district. Muralambeen was first taken up in 1876 by Christopher Allingham, and the site today includes a timber house erected c. 1881-83 for John Allingham.

The first European penetration of the Kennedy pastoral district began in the mid-1840s when Ludwig Leichhardt passed west of the Herbert River while exploring the upper Burdekin Valley. No immediate attempts were made to settle this region, with sporadic explorations taking place following Leichhardt's journey.

One of the earliest squatter settlers to follow Leichhardt was Christopher Allingham. He had immigrated to Australia with his parents and family in 1841 from County Fermanagh, Ireland. The family was well-established farmers and business people in Ireland, and on arriving in Australia the Allinghams settled near Armidale in New South Wales where they engaged in grazing and inn keeping. In 1852, in the wake of the public acclaim afforded to Leichhardt's ventures in north Queensland, Christopher Allingham left Armidale in search of pastoral land in the Burdekin region, only to return to New South Wales when he found the land was not available for selection. When Christopher made his next expedition north in 1859 he was accompanied by his cousin, John Allingham, who had arrived in Australia 4 years earlier. The two men travelled with cattle and sheep, and in 1861 arrived in the Burdekin region where they took up the run they called Hillgrove. John soon after moved back to Armidale and married Frances Allingham (same surname but not related to John) in 1862. The young bride returned with her husband to Hillgrove and was reputedly the first white female to live north of the Burdekin River.

The 1870s was in general an era of expansion for the Kennedy pastoral district and graziers were facing improved economic prospects and stability following the financial crisis of the previous decade. By this time, John's brother, Johnstone Allingham, had joined the family at Hillgrove and during the 1870s the Allinghams extended their pastoral interests in north Queensland by taking up Kangaroo Hills and Waterview stations. In late 1875 and early 1876, Christopher Allingham also took up a number of selections in the County of Cardwell, including Selection 171 which contains the present homestead site. The selection was approved on 22 January 1876 and comprised a total of 1,309 acres (530 ha).

By November 1876, Christopher had returned to New South Wales where he died and the lease to Muralambeen was transferred to John Allingham, who added a further 1,280 acres (520 ha) of leasehold land to the original selection in October 1881. One year earlier, John was issued with a notice from the Lands Department that compelled him to build a house on the property to satisfy the residency conditions on selection. No form of house had previously been erected on the site and in a deposition to the Law Agent of Cardwell in November 1880 John Allingham claimed this oversight was due to him being unaware of the residency conditions on selection when he became trustee of Christopher's estate. In a letter to the Under Secretary of Public Lands in December 1880 John Allingham stated that "the wet season having apparently set in, it is impossible to get about on the land in question to erect the necessary buildings &c. for the purpose of residence" and the following February a similar claim was made to the Lands Department. At this time, John and Frances Allingham were living at Kangaroo Hills, however on 2 November 1881 their residence at that station was destroyed by fire. By 3 January 1883, a house valued at £50 had been constructed at Muralambeen, the whole property had been fenced and a significant garden had been laid. It was a modest, one-room house built on stumps and constructed from oregon pine and eucalypt hardwood from Maryborough with a surrounding verandah and detached bedroom. A separate building with an earthen floor and corrugated iron walls and roof was used as the kitchen, storeroom and laundry, while another structure was built for the bathroom. John and Frances Allingham resided there between January 1883 and December 1884 and it is said that during this time it "grew into a commodious residence surrounded by a wealth of beautiful flowers, creepers, gaily coloured foliage plants and glorious trees". John and Frances returned to live in New South Wales in early 1885, leaving William Baggot and William H Broad as residents at Muralambeen. When John Allingham died in late 1885 Johnstone Allingham became lessee of Muralambeen. Frances remained in Armidale for some time and the station was left in the care of several managers before Johnstone Allingham moved his family there in 1894–95. In c 1900, Johnstone added a large wing to the residence, consisting of a row of 4 square bedrooms and an enclosed room in the north-western corner which was connected to the original house by a breezeway.

When Johnstone died in 1901, he was reputedly buried on the site and management of the property passed to his 3 sons. The following year, when a further 640 acres (260 ha) adjoining the original Muralambeen portion was selected, Frances was apparently residing once more at Muralambeen, which became known "at all times [as] a happy social centre" for the Allingham family. Around 1908, Frances appointed her nephew, James Allingham, as manager of the property and conveyance documents show that on 11 October 1911 title to the property was belatedly registered in the name of Frances Allingham. Following her death in 1916, the Union Trustee Company of Australia was appointed as executors of her estate and on 25 January 1918 James Allingham was registered as lessee of Muralambeen for a period of 5 years from 15 January 1917. In September 1928, James was registered as sole owner of the property and it was immediately used as collateral for a mortgage.

Following a cyclone in 1940, repairs and extensions were carried out to the Muralambeen house and in 1952 James Allingham demolished the original kitchen and converted an enclosed verandah in the house to the new kitchen. When the Victoria Sugar Mill was constructed, sugar cane was grown on the property again in 1952 following a failed venture in the early 1900s. In the early to mid 1950s, James began subdividing the land and over the years further subdivision has resulted in the reduction of the homestead site to its present size. James Allingham died in 1959 and the property has continued to remain in the family.

== Description ==
Muralambeen, a rural property close to the north Queensland coast near the Palm Islands, is situated on the fertile flood plains of the Herbert River, south east of Ingham. The approach to Muralambeen is via a long drive flanked by mature pine trees. The homestead, a single storey low set timber residence with corrugated iron hipped roofs, is set in a shady fenced garden surrounded by agricultural land. Lucy and Palm Creeks flow past just to the south of the homestead garden.

The house is raised approximately 1 metre (3 ft 3 in) above the ground on short concrete stumps and surrounded by verandahs. Short flights of stairs lead to the verandah on the western, northern and eastern sides of the house. The verandahs, which continue all the way around the building except for the southwest corner, are screened by lattice panels and partly enclosed with cement sheeting and timber casement windows.

The roof of the house has been amalgamated and extended over time. Once a pair of simple hip roofs surrounded by lower pitched verandah roofs, various extensions and alterations have created a complex roofscape of interlocking hipped roofs with box gutters, valleys and ridges. The roof is modest in scale and appearance due to the relatively low pitches used and the small size of the original elements.

The house is largely constructed of timber. Simple timber posts support unlined verandah roofs with exposed timber framing. Wall construction consists of outside studding with timber cross bracing and single skin linings of timber boards. The boards in exterior walls are laid horizontally. They are profiled as chamferboards on the outside and as beaded boards on the internal face. Newer sections of the house are clad and lined with cement sheeting, except for the southern wall of the house which is clad with timber chamferboards. The older sections of the house have double hung timber-framed windows and timber-framed French doors opening onto the verandahs. Casement windows are used in the newer works.

Built in stages, the house consists of an original core, a major addition of a northern wing and various accretions. The house, with the exception of the southwest corner, has a suspended timber floor and is roughly L-shaped in plan. The original core and the northern addition are one room in width and are joined by an enclosed breezeway. Utility spaces have been created by enclosing sections of the verandah.

The breezeway, which forms the main entrance to the house, is centrally located connecting the east and west verandahs. Narrower on the western end, it is the only large living space and is the focus of the interior. Formerly the junction of two verandahs, the breezeway has been enclosed with timber casement windows and cement sheeting. The roof over the breezeway has been raised and the floor replaced with narrow timber boards.

The wing on the north side of the breezeway contains a row of three bedrooms. The bedroom on the northeast corner, formerly two rooms, is twice the size of the other bedrooms. The central bedroom is now used as a study. A small room, originally enclosed with insect screens, has been built into the north west corner of the verandah. Timber panelled doors open from these rooms onto the northern verandah.

On the southern side of the breezeway is the oldest part of the house, consisting of two bedrooms and surviving sections of the original verandah. The kitchen and associated scullery and a dining area have been built into the original verandah and have raked ceilings. A bathroom of relatively recent construction, has been added to the narrow western end of the breezeway. The dining area is an extension of the breezeway. The kitchen, originally a detached building, is located in the enclosed southern verandah. A stove alcove has been built, projecting beyond the line of the original verandah. The adjoining scullery is lined with timber shelves for crockery. A servery window in the scullery overlooks the former washing up area, now the laundry and once the location of the house's only water supply.

The semi-enclosed laundry area, on the southwest corner of the house, is separated from the main house by a change in floor level. The floor of the laundry area is a concrete slab on the ground. Located in the crook of the L-shape formed by the main house, it was built on the site of the original detached kitchen. It also contains a toilet and a shower and is partly enclosed with cement sheeted walls and insect screens.

The garden contains large shade trees and various decorative shrubs. Lawns to the north and east of the house are the locations of former rose gardens and tennis courts. A large timber and steel shade structure is adjacent to the southwest corner of the house. A small garage is located to the west of the house.

== Heritage listing ==
Muralambeen Homestead was listed on the Queensland Heritage Register on 25 February 2005 having satisfied the following criteria.

The place is important in demonstrating the evolution or pattern of Queensland's history.

Muralambeen was first selected in 1876 by Christopher Allingham and a portion of the surviving house was constructed c 1881–83 by John Allingham. The site stands as important surviving evidence of the early exploration and settlement of north Queensland in a period when pastoralists were experiencing improved financial fortunes and the region was expanding demographically and economically.

The place is important in demonstrating the principal characteristics of a particular class of cultural places.

Built initially to satisfy selection requirements, Muralambeen demonstrates the principal characteristics of a rural homestead including low-set single storey timber construction, extensive verandahs and a form evolved from gradual additions to the original house. The house retains its original core and subsequent expansion and modifications are clearly visible in the fabric of the house. A relatively well-preserved example of architecture of the Queensland pastoral frontier, it is a valued part of the historical character of the area.

The place has a special association with the life or work of a particular person, group or organisation of importance in Queensland's history.

The house and property are also significant for its association with the Allingham family, who has had an association with the homestead site for nearly 130 years. Christopher Allingham was one of the earliest European settlers in the Kennedy pastoral district to follow the expeditions of Ludwig Leichhardt. The Allingham family were pioneers of the district and played a key role in the pastoral history of north Queensland.
