= Hawkins Creek, Queensland =

Hawkins Creek
- Suburb
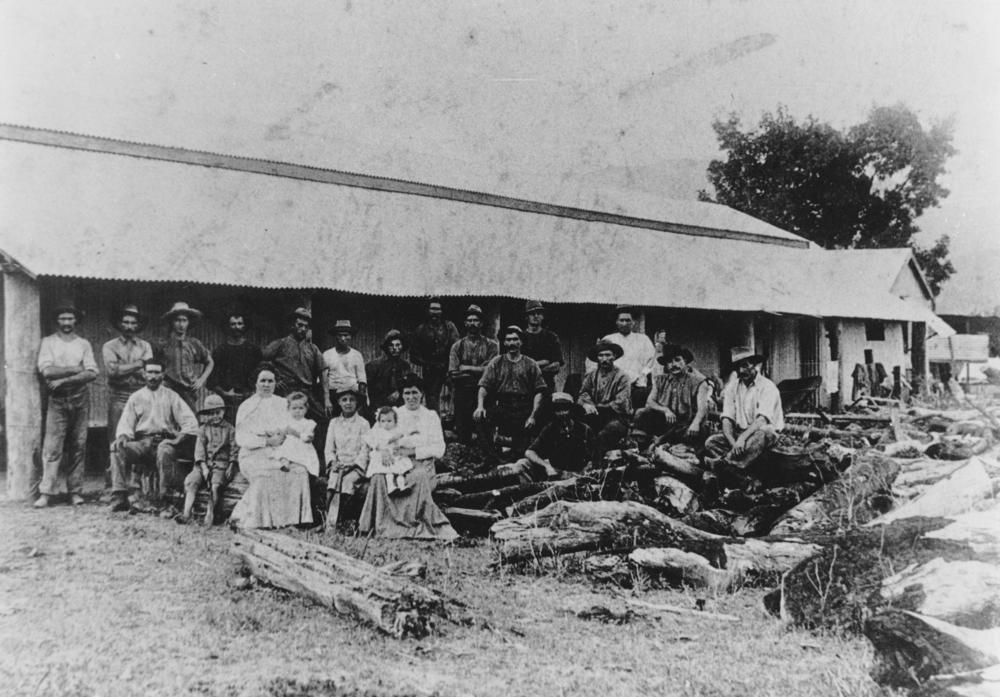
- Farm shed at Hawkins Creek, circa 1912

- Interactive map of Hawkins Creek
- Coordinates: 18.5787°S 146.1169°E
- Country: Australia
- State: Queensland
- LGA: Shire of Hinchinbrook
- Location: 12.1 km (7.5 mi) NW of Ingham; 123 km (76 mi) NW of Townsville; 1,455 km (904 mi) NNW of Brisbane

Government
  - State electorate: Hinchinbrook
  - Federal division: Kennedy

Area
  - Total: 111.4 km^{2} (43.0 sq mi)

Population
  - Total: 236 (2021 census)
  - Density: 2.118/km^{2} (5.487/sq mi)
- Time zone: UTC+10:00 (AEST)
- Postcode: 4850
Suburbs around Hawkins Creek
| Dalrymple Creek | Dalrymple Creek | Rungoo |
| Lannercost | Hawkins Creek | Bemerside |
| Trebonne | Ingham | Gairloch |

Hawkins Creek is a rural locality in the Shire of Hinchinbrook, Queensland, Australia. In the 2021 census, Hawkins Creek had a population of 236 people.

== Geography ==
The locality is bounded to the south-east, south, south-west, and west by the Herbert River, and to the north-west loosely by the Mount Leach Range.

The northern half of the locality is within the Girrigun National Park, which extends into neighbouring Damrymple Creek and Rungoo. The terrain within the national park is mountainous, ranging from 30 to 850 metres (98 to 2,789 ft) above sea level, with three named peaks:

- Gardiner Mountain (18.5388°S 146.1502°E) 641 metres (2,103 ft)
- Mount Hawkins (18.5548°S 146.1016°E) 735 metres (2,411 ft)
- South Gardiner Mountain (18.5750°S 146.1413°E) 372 metres (1,220 ft)

The southern half of the locality is lower-lying land being 10 to 20 metres (33 to 66 ft) above sea level. It is predominantly used for growing sugarcane. A cane tramway passes through this area enabling the harvested sugarcane to be transferred to the Macknade Sugar Mill in Macknade for crushing.

== History ==
Warrgamay (also known as Waragamai, Wargamay, Wargamaygan, Biyay, and Warakamai) is an Australian Aboriginal language in North Queensland. The language region includes the Herbert River area, Ingham, Hawkins Creek, Long Pocket, Herbert Vale, Niagara Vale, Yamanic Creek, Herbert Gorge, Cardwell, Hinchinbrook Island and the adjacent mainland.

Hawkins Creek State School (sometimes written Hawkin's Creek State School) opened on 9 October 1912 and closed on 31 December 2003. It was at 18 Gortons Road (18.6122°S 146.0945°E).

The Catholic Church of the Holy Family opened in 1953. It was in Hawkins Creek Road.

== Demographics ==
In the 2016 census, Hawkins Creek had a population of 216 people.

In the 2021 census, Hawkins Creek had a population of 236 people.

== Education ==
There are no schools in Hawkins Creek. The nearest government primary and secondary schools are Ingham State School and Ingham State High School, both in neighbouring Ingham to the south.
