= Forrest Beach, Queensland =

Forrest Beach
- Suburb
- Interactive map of Forrest Beach
- Coordinates: 18.7177°S 146.2852°E
- Country: Australia
- State: Queensland
- LGA: Shire of Hinchinbrook
- Location: 16 km (9.9 mi) SE of Ingham; 85 km (53 mi) NW of Townsville; 1,195 km (743 mi) NW of Brisbane
- Established: 1925

Government
  - State electorate: Hinchinbrook
  - Federal division: Kennedy

Area
  - Total: 67.3 km^{2} (26.0 sq mi)

Population
  - Total: 1,364 (2021 census)
  - Density: 20.267/km^{2} (52.49/sq mi)
- Postcode: 4850
Suburbs around Forrest Beach
Braemeadows	Braemeadows	Taylors Beach
Blackrock	Forrest Beach	Coral Sea
Orient	Orient	Coral Sea

Forrest Beach is a coastal locality in the Shire of Hinchinbrook, Queensland, Australia. In the 2021 census, Forrest Beach had a population of 1,364 people.

Allingham is the coastal town within the locality. Lady Elliot Reef lies close to the coast, about 5 km (3.1 mi) north of Forrest Beach.

== Geography ==
Forrest Beach is bounded by the Coral Sea to the east with long sandy beaches; it is sheltered water due to the Orpheus and Palm island group. It is bounded along the south-west by Palm Creek and contains the Palm Creek Conservation Park. There is farming in the western part of the locality. The residential development is mostly beside the northern beaches. There is a small residential area beside the southern beaches known as Cassady Beach (18°43′48″S 146°17′37″E) which is named after Francis Andrew O'Connor Cassady who was chairman of the Shire of Hinchinbrook.

=== Lady Elliot Reef ===
Lady Elliot Reef is a coral reef, part of the Great Barrier Reef, named after the Lady Elliot, said to be wrecked at this spot in 1816.

== History ==
The name Forrest Beach derives from George Brownrigg Forrest, who was the manager of the Victoria Mill (a sugar mill) near Ingham, while Christopher Allingham was one of the first European pastoral settlers in the district, taking up the pastoral run Muralambeen.

Allingham was surveyed as a town in 1925.

The Forrest Beach Surf Life Saving Club was established in 1927 but closed in 1956. The Hinchinbrook Shire Council initiated a meeting which caused the club to reopen in 1958-9.

Allingham Post Office opened on 1 March 1967.

Forrest Beach State School opened on 29 January 1980.

Forrest Beach War Memorial was dedicated in 2006. It commemorates Australian servicemen and women who served in all wars and conflicts. It is located at the north-east corner of the intersection of Palm Street and Pine Street (18.713140°S 146.297743°E).

In July 2026, unidentified spherical objects were washed up on the beach and also found in neighbouring Blackrock. They were suspected to contain hazardous liquids and local homes were evacuated. It was believed that the objects were "space junk" and the Australian Space Agency was investigating them.

== Demographics ==
In the 2011 census, Forrest Beach had a population of 1,233 people.

In the 2016 census, Forrest Beach had a population of 1,254 people.

In the 2021 census, Forrest Beach had a population of 1,364 people.

== Heritage listings ==
Forrest Beach has a number of heritage-listed sites, including:

- Muralambeen Homestead (the home of the Allingham family), off Bosworth's Road (18.6976°S 146.238°E)

== Education ==
Forrest Beach State School is a government primary (Prep-6) school for boys and girls at 40 Pandanus Street (18.7114°S 146.2943°E). In 2012, the school had an enrolment of 51 students. In 2018, the school had an enrolment of 38 students with 6 teachers (3 full-time equivalent) and 7 non-teaching staff (4 full-time equivalent).

There are no secondary schools in Forrest Beach. The nearest government secondary school is Ingham State High School in Ingham.

Gilroy Santa Maria College is a Catholic school for boys and girls in Ingham. St Teresa's College in Abergowrie is a secondary Catholic boys school but it is further north.

== Amenities ==
There is a one-lane boat ramp into the Coral Sea at Sheoak Street.

The Forrest Beach branch of the Queensland Country Women's Association meets at the Kenmore Library at 6 Palm Street.
