= Blackrock, Queensland =

Blackrock
- Suburb
- Interactive map of Blackrock
- Coordinates: 18.7065°S 146.2086°E
- Country: Australia
- State: Queensland
- LGA: Shire of Hinchinbrook
- Location: 5.3 km (3.3 mi) SSE of Ingham; 111 km (69 mi) NW of Townsville; 240 km (150 mi) S of Cairns; 1,469 km (913 mi) NNW of Brisbane

Government
  - State electorate: Hinchinbrook
  - Federal division: Kennedy

Area
  - Total: 63.4 km^{2} (24.5 sq mi)

Population
  - Total: 319 (2021 census)
  - Density: 5.032/km^{2} (13.032/sq mi)
- Time zone: UTC+10:00 (AEST)
- Postcode: 4850
Suburbs around Blackrock
Ingham	Victoria Plantation	Braemeadows
Toobanna	Blackrock	Forrest Beach
Toobanna	Orient	Orient

Blackrock is a rural locality in the Shire of Hinchinbrook, Queensland, Australia. In the 2021 census, Blackrock had a population of 319 people.

== Geography ==
Blackrock lies to the immediate south-east of the town and locality of Ingham.

Palm Creek forms the northern, north-eastern, eastern, and south-eastern boundaries of the locality. It then flows south-east ending at the Coral Sea between the localities of Forrest Beach and Orient.

Blackrock has the following mountains:

- Mount Mercer (also known as Warren's Hill) (18.6898°S 146.2150°E), rising 67 metres (220 ft) above sea level
- Mount Margaret (18.7076°S 146.2251°E), 36 metres (118 ft)

There are two main access roads into Blackrock, both commencing in Ingham:

- Warrens Hill Road which terminates at Mount Mercer (Warren's Hill)
- Orient Road which runs further to the south and exits the locality to the south (Orient)

The land use is predominantly crop growing (mostly sugarcane) with some grazing on native vegetation. There is a network of cane tramways to transport the harvested sugarcane to the Victoria sugar mill at Victoria Plantation.

== History ==
The locality was officially named and bounded on 27 April 2001. However, that name has been used at least informally for the area since at least 1927.

In July 2026, unidentified spherical objects were found in Blackrock and were also washed up on neighbouring Forrest Beach. They were suspected to contain hazardous liquids and local homes were evacuated. It was believed that the objects were "space junk" and the Australian Space Agency was investigating them.

== Demographics ==
In the 2016 census Blackrock had a population of 320 people.

In the 2021 census, Blackrock had a population of 319 people.

== Education ==
There are no schools in Blackrock. The nearest government primary schools are:

- Ingham State School in neighbouring Ingham to the north-west
- Toobanna State School in neighbouring Toobanna to the west
- Victoria Plantation State School in neighbouring Victoria Plantation to the north

The nearest government secondary school is Ingham State High School in Ingham.
