= Braemeadows =

- Suburb
- Interactive map of Braemeadows
- Coordinates: 18.6486°S 146.2625°E
- Country: Australia
- State: Queensland
- LGA: Shire of Hinchinbrook
- Location: 12.7 km (7.9 mi) E of Ingham; 124 km (77 mi) NW of Townsville; 242 km (150 mi) S of Cairns; 1,480 km (920 mi) NNW of Brisbane

Government
  - State electorate: Hinchinbrook
  - Federal division: Kennedy

Area
  - Total: 64.2 km^{2} (24.8 sq mi)

Population
  - Total: 269 (2021 census)
  - Density: 4.190/km^{2} (10.852/sq mi)
- Time zone: UTC+10:00 (AEST)
- Postcode: 4850
Suburbs around Braemeadows
Cordelia	Cordelia	Halifax
Victoria Plantation	Braemeadows	Taylors Beach
Blackrock	Forrest Beach	Forrest Beach

Braemeadows is a rural locality in the Shire of Hinchinbrook, Queensland, Australia. In the 2021 census, Braemeadows had a population of 269 people.

== Geography ==
The locality is bounded to the north-west by Lagoon Creek and to the south-west by Palm Creek.

The north-east of the locality is marshland, but the land use in the rest of the locality is crop growing (predominantly sugarcane). There is a network of cane tramways to transport the harvested sugarcane to the Victoria sugar mill in neighbouring Victoria Plantation to the west.

== History ==
Braemeadows State School opened in 1928 and closed in 1969. It was on a 3-acre (1.2 ha) site on the southern side of Four Mile Road commencing at the junction with Robinos Road and extending eastwards (18.62953°S 146.26186°E).

== Demographics ==
In the 2016 census Braemeadows had a population of 290 people.

In the 2021 census, Braemeadows had a population of 269 people.

== Education ==
There are no schools in Braemeadows. The nearest government primary schools are Victoria Plantation State School in neighbouring Victoria Plantation to the west, Halifax State School in neighbouring Halifax to the north-east, and Forrest Beach State School in neighbouring Forrest Beach to the south-east. The nearest government secondary school is Ingham State High School in Ingham to the west. There are also a number of non-government schools in Ingham.
