= Rungoo, Queensland =

Rungoo
- Suburb
- Interactive map of Rungoo
- Coordinates: 18.4872°S 146.16°E
- Country: Australia
- State: Queensland
- LGA: Cassowary Coast Region
- Location: 18.3 km (11.4 mi) N of Ingham; 130 km (81 mi) S of Innisfail; 130 km (81 mi) NNW of Townsville; 1,491 km (926 mi) NNW of Brisbane

Government
  - State electorate: Hinchinbrook
  - Federal division: Kennedy

Area
  - Total: 89.0 km^{2} (34.4 sq mi)

Population
  - Total: 11 (2021 census)
  - Density: 0.124/km^{2} (0.320/sq mi)
- Time zone: UTC+10:00 (AEST)
- Postcode: 4849
Suburbs around Rungoo
Damper Creek	Damper Creek	Hinchinbrook Channel
Dalrymple Creek	Rungoo	Hinchinbrook Channel
Hawkins Creek	Bemerside	Macknade

Rungoo is a coastal locality in the Cassowary Coast Region, Queensland, Australia. In the 2021 census, Rungoo had a population of 11 people.

== Geography ==
The Hinchinbrook Channel and its inlets form the eastern boundary of the locality, while the northern boundary loosely follows Porter Creek.

The Bruce Highway enters the locality from the south (Bemerside) and exits to the north (Damper Creek).

The North Coast railway line also enters the locality from the south (Bemerside) and exits to the north (Damper Creek). It is to the east of the highway as it enters and exits the locality but runs immediately parallel and west of the highway through most of the locality. The locality was historically served by the now-abandoned Rungoo railway station (18.4829°S 146.1715°E).

The terrain varies. To the east of the railway line and highway is low-lying land from 0 to 10 metres (0 to 33 ft) above sea level, but, to the west, the terrain is mountainous rising to 866 metres (2,841 ft) with a number of named peaks:

- Bishop Peak (18.4753°S 146.1225°E) 866 metres (2,841 ft)
- Mount Leach (18.5156°S 146.1438°E) 476 metres (1,562 ft)

There are a number of flat low-lying marine islands along the coast which are within the locality boundaries, but only one is named, Benjamin Flats (20.7 square kilometres (8.0 sq mi) at 18.4333°S 146.1833°E).

Most of the locality is within one of two protected areas. In the north is the Cardwell State Forest. The remainder of the locality is mostly within the Girringun National Park, part of the Wet Tropics World Heritage Area.

The land not within a protected area includes two of the larger marine islands (one of them being Benjamin Flats), both of which are marshland, and two pockets of land in the south of the locality immediately west of the railway line, used for rural residential housing, some crop growing, and grazing on native vegetation.

== History ==
Rungoo was named after the former Rungoo railway station, which was in turn named on 26 June 1925 by the Queensland Railways Department. It is believed to be an Aboriginal word meaning camping place.

== Demographics ==
In the 2016 census, Rungoo had a population of 12 people.

In the 2021 census, Rungoo had a population of 11 people.

== Education ==
There are no schools in Rungoo. The nearest government primary school is Macknade State School in neighbouring Macknade to the south-east. The nearest government secondary school is Ingham State High School in Ingham to the south. There are also Catholic and independent schools in Ingham.

== Amenities ==
The Fisher Creek boat ramp is east of the Bruce Highway and, despite its name, provides access into nearby Plunkett Creek (18.4576°S 146.1507°E). It is managed by the Cassowary Coast Regional Council.
