= Lady Elliot =

Ship wrecked off the coast of Australia

Coordinates: 18.139°S 146.104°E

Lady Elliot was a ship that was probably wrecked off the coast near Cardwell, Queensland, Australia in 1816. It was a ship of 353 tons and had been constructed in Bengal, India, completed in 1815.

The ship was named after Anna Maria Elliot, the wife of Gilbert Elliot-Murray-Kynynmound, 1st Earl of Minto, a Scottish politician who was Governor-General of India between 1807 and 1813. Anna Maria (later Lady Elliot) was the daughter of Sir George Amyand, 1st Baronet. ]

The ship was registered in Calcutta and was under the command of Thomas Stewart. Sometime before 23 June 1816, Lady Elliot Island was officially discovered and named by Captain Thomas Stewart aboard Lady Elliot. The ship arrived in Sydney from Calcutta on 23 June 1816 with a cargo of mixed merchandise.

The ship left Sydney sometime between 12 and 22 September for Batavia under the captaincy of Joshua Abbott. The ship was carrying a cargo of hats, indigo, sealskins, turpentine, tar and white lead. The ship apparently never reached Batavia and the wreck was not found until some years after. The crew of 54, who were mostly Lascars, probably drowned or perished on reaching shore. It was wrecked on a reef about 70 km (43 mi) south of Cardwell in North Queensland (near Forrest Beach), which is now named Lady Elliot Reef.

According to the Australasian Underwater Cultural Heritage Database, there are conflicting reports regarding the fate of the Lady Elliot. According to Loney (Wrecks on the Queensland Coast, 1993, p. 31) the Lady Elliot left Sydney for Batavia (Jakarta) in late September 1816 but did not arrive. Wreckage at the mouth of a small creek at Cardwell was identified as the Lady Elliot, and it was presumed that all on board were lost. Stone (Encyclopedia of Australian Shipwrecks and other Maritime Incidents, 2006, p. 510) supports Loney's version of events. According to Paterson (Wreck-ollections: Ships and Shipwrecks in Queensland Waters (Volume 1), 2003, p. 90) despite the vessel being posted as missing at sea, it arrived at Batavia (Jakarta) after 107 days at sea, as was reported in the Calcutta Gazette of 27 February 1817. Paterson states that the identification of wreckage at the mouth of a creek 13 kilometres (8.1 mi) north of Cardwell was later found to be false, as the Lady Elliot was finally wrecked near the Caroline Islands.

Research details compiled for the Queensland Museum Wreck Register indicates the vessel was refloated, as a Dutch newspaper reference (Javaasche Courant) announced the vessel's arrival in Java in November 1816, i.e. after the supposed date of loss.
