= Victoria Plantation, Queensland =

Victoria Plantation
- Suburb
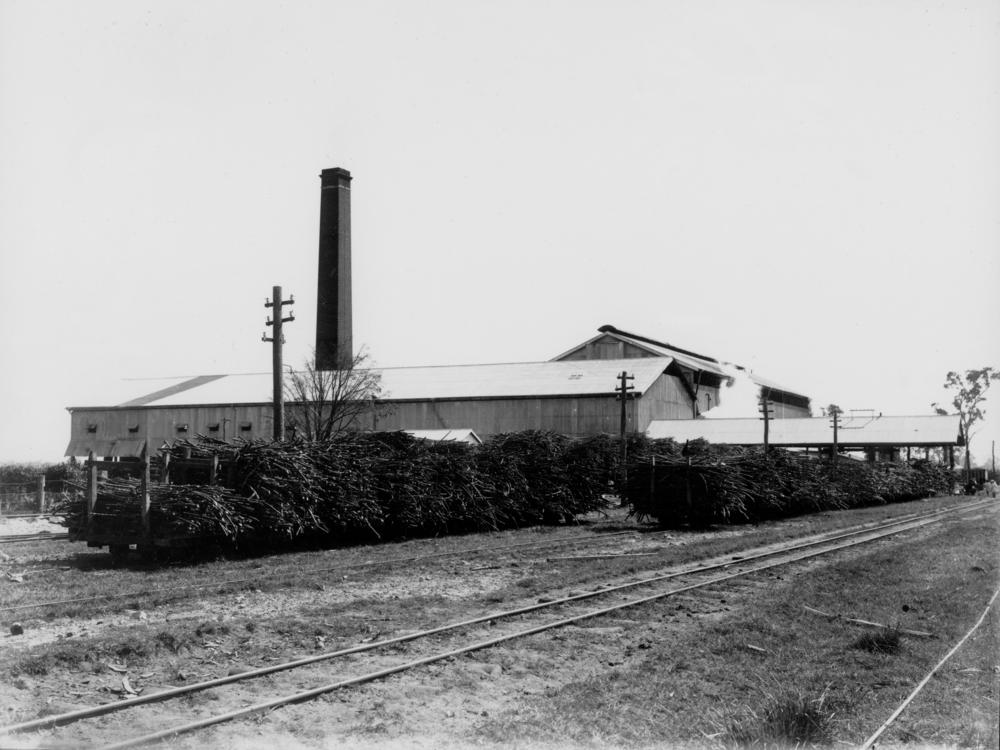
- Victoria Sugar Mill, circa 1915

- Interactive map of Victoria Plantation
- Coordinates: 18.6441°S 146.2083°E
- Country: Australia
- State: Queensland
- LGA: Shire of Hinchinbrook
- Location: 5.4 km (3.4 mi) E of Ingham; 116 km (72 mi) NW of Townsville; 239 km (149 mi) S of Cairns; 1,473 km (915 mi) NNW of Brisbane

Government
  - State electorate: Hinchinbrook
  - Federal division: Kennedy

Area
  - Total: 12.7 km^{2} (4.9 sq mi)

Population
  - Total: 169 (2021 census)
  - Density: 13.31/km^{2} (34.47/sq mi)
- Time zone: UTC+10:00 (AEST)
- Postcode: 4850
Suburbs around Victoria Plantation
| Foresthome | Foresthome | Cordelia |
| Ingham | Victoria Plantation | Braemeadows |
| Blackrock | Braemeadows | Braemeadows |

Victoria Plantation is a rural locality in the Shire of Hinchinbrook, Queensland, Australia. In the 2021 census, Victoria Plantation had a population of 169 people.

== Geography ==
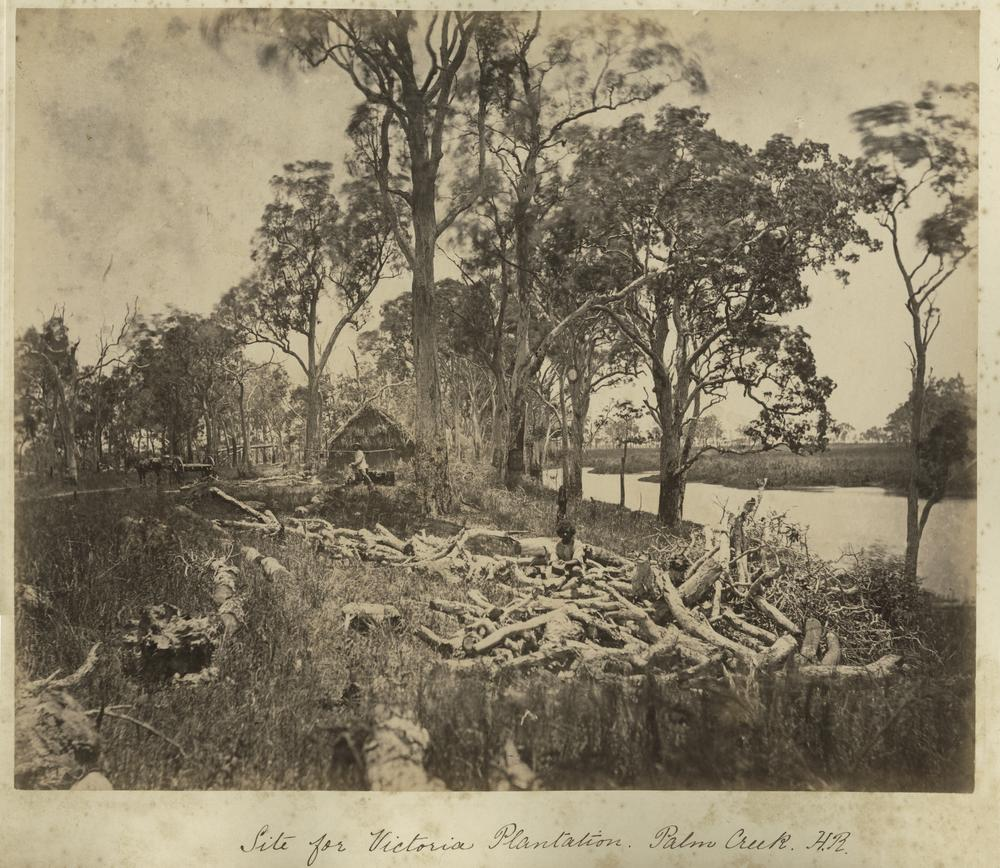
Clearing the site for the Victoria Plantation at Palm Creek, near Ingham, ca. 1881

Victoria Plantation is directly east of the town of Ingham. It is a sugarcane growing area, with a network of cane tramways connecting the plantations to the Victoria Sugar Mill in the south of the locality beside Palm Creek (18.6508°S 146.2027°E). The mill is operated by Wilmar Sugar Australia.

== History ==
Victoria Sugar Mill was established in 1883 by the Colonial Sugar Refining Company.

Victoria Plantation Provisional School opened on 1 March 1894, becoming Victoria Plantation State School on 1 January 1909.

== Demographics ==
In the 2016 census, Victoria Plantation had a population of 156 people.

In the 2021 census, Victoria Plantation had a population of 169 people.

== Education ==
Victoria Plantation State School is a government primary (Prep-6) school for boys and girls at 244 Forrest Beach Road (18.6472°S 146.2013°E). In 2016, the school had an enrolment of 74 students with 8 teachers (5 full-time equivalent) with 6 non-teaching staff (4 full-time equivalent). In 2018, the school had an enrolment of 38 students with 4 teachers (3 full-time equivalent) and 5 non-teaching staff (3 full-time equivalent).

There are no secondary schools in Victoria Plantation. The nearest government secondary school is Ingham State High School in neighbouring Ingham to the west. There are also non-government schools in Ingham.

== See also ==
- List of tramways in Queensland
