= Cordelia, Queensland =

Cordelia
- Suburb
- Interactive map of Cordelia
- Coordinates: 18.6052°S 146.2461°E
- Country: Australia
- State: Queensland
- LGA: Shire of Hinchinbrook
- Location: 12.2 km (7.6 mi) NE of Ingham; 126 km (78 mi) NW of Townsville; 1,483 km (921 mi) NNW of Brisbane

Government
  - State electorate: Hinchinbrook
  - Federal division: Kennedy

Area
  - Total: 17.6 km^{2} (6.8 sq mi)

Population
  - Total: 176 (2021 census)
  - Density: 10.00/km^{2} (25.90/sq mi)
- Time zone: UTC+10:00 (AEST)
- Postcode: 4850
Suburbs around Cordelia
Bemerside	Macknade	Macknade
Foresthome	Cordelia	Halifax
Victoria Plantation	Braemeadows	Braemeadows

Cordelia is a rural locality in the Shire of Hinchinbrook, Queensland, Australia. In the 2021 census, Cordelia had a population of 176 people.

== Geography ==
Cordelia has the following mountains:

- Mount Catherina (18.6103°S 146.2462°E) 210 metres (690 ft)
- Mount Cordelia (18.6108°S 146.2399°E) 224 metres (735 ft)

The land use is mostly crop growing (predominantly sugarcane).

== History ==
Cordelia Provisional School opened circa 1891. It closed circa 1893.

Cordelia State School opened on 13 April 1918 and closed on 15 March 1993. The school was at 15 Cordelia School Road (18.5964°S 146.2591°E).

== Demographics ==
In the 2016 census, Cordelia had a population of 210 people.

In the 2021 census, Cordelia had a population of 176 people.

== Education ==
There are no schools in Cordelia. The nearest government primary schools are Victoria Plantation State School in neighbouring Victoria Plantation to the south-west and Halifax State School in neighbouring Halifax to the east. The nearest government secondary school is Ingham State High School in Ingham to the south-west.
