= Gairloch, Queensland =

Gairloch
- Suburb
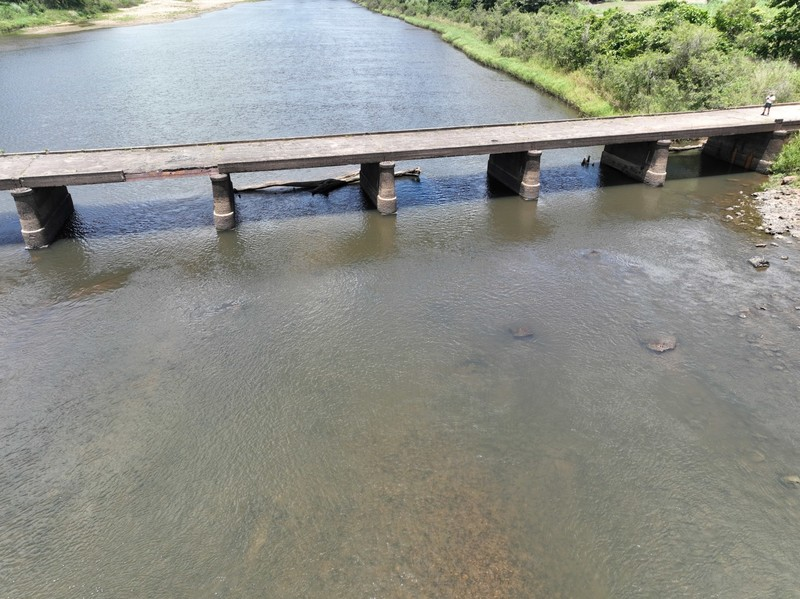
- Old Gairloch Bridge, 2024

- Interactive map of Gairloch
- Coordinates: 18.6019°S 146.1780°E
- Country: Australia
- State: Queensland
- LGA: Shire of Hinchinbrook
- Location: 5.4 km (3.4 mi) NE of Ingham; 121 km (75 mi) NW of Townsville; 230 km (140 mi) S of Cairns; 1,472 km (915 mi) NNW of Brisbane

Government
  - State electorate: Hinchinbrook
  - Federal division: Kennedy

Area
  - Total: 13.4 km^{2} (5.2 sq mi)

Population
  - Total: 31 (2021 census)
  - Density: 2.31/km^{2} (5.99/sq mi)
- Time zone: UTC+10:00 (AEST)
- Postcode: 4850
Suburbs around Gairloch
Bemerside	Bemerside	Bemerside
Hawkins Creek	Gairloch	Foresthome
Hawkins Creek	Ingham	Foresthome

Gairloch is a rural locality in the Shire of Hinchinbrook, Queensland, Australia. In the 2021 census, Gairloch had a population of 31 people.

== Geography ==
The locality is bounded by the Herbert River to the east and by Ripple Creek, a tributary of the Herbert River, to the north.

The Bruce Highway enters the locality from the south (Ingham) crossing the river on the Sir John Row Bridge into Gairloch. The highway exits to the north to the locality (Bemerside).

The predominant land use is growing sugarcane. There is a network of cane tramways to transport the harvested sugarcane to the local sugar mill.

== History ==
Historically, Gairloch was south of the Herbert River where the now-abandoned Gairloch railway station was located (18.628181°S 146.1814685°E). The land to the north of the Herbert River was known as North Gairloch. Gairloch and North Garloch were connected via the Garloch Bridge (18.61663°S 146.18307°E). Today, the northern side of the river is known simply as Gairloch and the land known as Gairloch on the southern side of the river is now within the localities of Ingham and Foresthome. The former Gairloch railway station is now within Foresthome.

In October 1921, the Queensland Government approved the construction of the North Gairloch State School at a cost of £869. The school opened in July 1922. In October 1936, tenders were called to build a teacher's residence. The school closed circa 1942. The school was on the north-western side of Hawkins Creek Road (approx 18.62575°S 146.15848°E).

In January 1955, a crocodile was sighted in the Herbert River near Gairloch.

== Demographics ==
In the 2016 census, Gairloch had a population of 41 people.

In the 2021 census, Gairloch had a population of 31 people.

== Heritage listings ==
Ingham has a number of heritage-listed sites, including:

- Gairloch Bridge, Old Bruce Highway between Foresthome and Gairloch

== Education ==
There are no schools in Gairloch. The nearest government primary schools are Ingham State School in neighbouring Ingham to the south and Macknade State School in Macknade to the north-east. The nearest government secondary school is Ingham State High School, also in Ingham. There are also non-government primary and secondary schools in Ingham.
