= Taylors Beach, Queensland =

Taylors Beach
- Town
- Interactive map of Taylors Beach
- Coordinates: 18.6225°S 146.3275°E
- Country: Australia
- State: Queensland
- LGA: Shire of Hinchinbrook
- Location: 24.2 km (15.0 mi) NE of Ingham; 136 km (85 mi) NW of Townsville; 1,471 km (914 mi) NNW of Brisbane

Government
  - State electorate: Hinchinbrook
  - Federal division: Kennedy

Area
  - Total: 33.1 km^{2} (12.8 sq mi)

Population
  - Total: 297 (2021 census)
  - Density: 8.973/km^{2} (23.24/sq mi)
- Time zone: UTC+10:00 (AEST)
- Postcode: 4850
Localities around Taylors Beach
Halifax	Halifax	Coral Sea
Braemeadows	Taylors Beach	Coral Sea
Braemeadows	Forrest Beach	Coral Sea

Taylors Beach is a coastal town and locality in the Shire of Hinchinbrook, Queensland, Australia. It takes its name from its beach. In the 2021 census, the locality of Taylors Beach had a population of 297 people.

== Geography ==
Taylors Beach is located 18 kilometres (11 mi) east of Ingham. It is bounded by the Coral Sea on the east where there are long sandy beaches. It is divided into a northern and southern section by the estuary where Victoria Creek flows into the Coral Sea; the southern section having a long northern spit providing shelter to the beaches of the northern part. The residential development is adjacent to the beaches of the northern part. Apart from some farming in the northern part, most of the locality is undeveloped.

== History ==
The town was formerly known as Cassady after Francis Andrew O'Connor Cassady who was mayor of the City of Townsville in 1894, 1901 and 1905. However, it was renamed Taylors Beach on 1 October 1969. The name Cassady is preserved in Cassady Beach, a small beachside community within neighbouring Forrest Beach (18°43′48″S 146°17′37″E).

== Demographics ==
In the 2011 census, the locality of Taylors Beach had a population of 351 people.

In the 2016 census, the locality of Taylors Beach had a population of 318 people.

In the 2021 census, the locality of Taylors Beach had a population of 297 people.

== Education ==
There are no schools in Taylors Beach. The nearest government primary school is Halifax State School in neighbouring Halifax to the north-west. The nearest government secondary school is Ingham State High School in Ingham to the west.

== Recreation ==
The town is a popular area for boating and fishing. There is a two-lane boat ramp into the estuary of Victoria Creek (18.624532°S 146.330192°E).
