= Bemerside, Queensland =

Bemerside
- Suburb
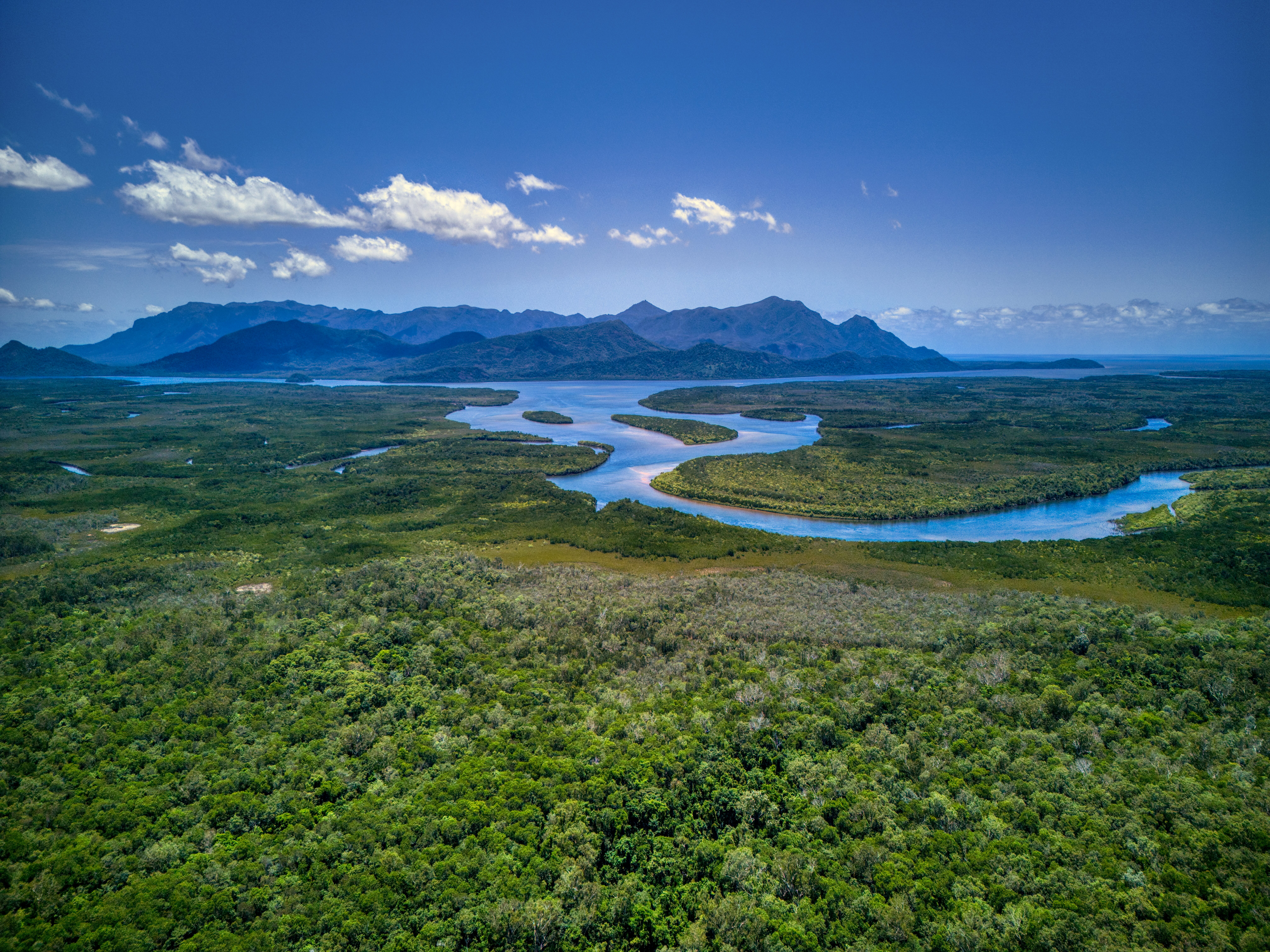
- View towards Hinchinbook Island from Hinchbrook Lookout in Bemerside, 2022

- Interactive map of Bemerside
- Coordinates: 18.5573°S 146.1925°E
- Country: Australia
- State: Queensland
- LGA: Shire of Hinchinbrook
- Location: 13.6 km (8.5 mi) NNE of Ingham; 125 km (78 mi) NW of Townsville; 1,456 km (905 mi) NNW of Brisbane

Government
  - State electorate: Hinchinbrook
  - Federal division: Kennedy

Area
  - Total: 50.7 km^{2} (19.6 sq mi)

Population
  - Total: 259 (2021 census)
  - Density: 5.108/km^{2} (13.23/sq mi)
- Time zone: UTC+10:00 (AEST)
- Postcode: 4850
Suburbs around Bemerside
Hawkins Creek	Rungoo	Macknade
Hawkins Creek	Bemerside	Macknade
Hawkins Creek	Gairloch; Foresthome	Cordelia

Bemerside is a rural locality in the Shire of Hinchinbrook, Queensland, Australia. In the 2021 census, Bemerside had a population of 259 people.

== Geography ==
Bemerside is bounded to the north-east by the Seymour River, to the south-east by the Anabranch River, to the south by the Herbert River and Ripple Creek. The Anabranch River is a tidal stream that connects the Seymour River to the Herbert River.

Bemerside has the following mountains along its eastern boundary (from north to south):

- Mount Cudmore (18.5478°S 146.2160°E) 307 metres (1,007 ft)
- Mount Separation (18.5615°S 146.2227°E) 117 metres (384 ft)
- Mount Maragen (18.5731°S 146.2361°E) 43 metres (141 ft)

The Girringun National Park is in the north of the locality, extending into the neighbouring localities of Rungoo and Hawkins Creek.

The Bruce Highway enters the locality from the south (Gairloch) and exits to the north (Rungoo).

The North Coast railway line enters the locality from the south (Foresthome) and exits to the north (Rungoo) with the locality served by two railway stations (from north to south):

- Hinchinbrook railway station (18.5293°S 146.1982°E)
- Bemerside railway station, now abandoned (18.5725°S 146.2213°E)

Ripple Creek is a neighbourhood (18.5833°S 146.2°E) in the south of the locality. It presumably takes its name from the nearby watercourse Ripple Creek, a tributary of the Herbert River.

The terrain is mountainous in the north-east with Mount Cudmore the highest point, but is otherwise flat and low-lying, approximately 10 metres (33 ft) above sea level. Most of the flat land is used to grow sugarcane. There is a cane tramway network to transport the harvested sugarcane to the Macknade sugar mill in neighbouring Macknade for crushing.

== History ==
The locality takes its name from the Bemerside Sugar Mill, established in 1873 and named after the town of Bermersyde (note the different spelling) in Scotland, which was associated with the Haig family who originally owned the sugar mill in conjunction with the Miles family.

Ripple Creek Provisional school opened on 19 June 1893. On 1 June 1909, it became Ripple Creek State School. In 1931 and 1932 there were temporary closures. It closed permanently on 16 December 1995. It was on Fulton Drive (18.5796°S 146.2053°E).

In February 2025 an 82-year-old woman died as a result of prolonged flooding in the region.

== Demographics ==
In the 2016 census, Bemerside had a population of 241 people.

In the 2021 census, Bemerside had a population of 259 people.

== Education ==
There are no schools in Bemerside. The nearest government primary schools are Macknade State School in neighbouring Macknade to the east and Ingham State School in Ingham to the south. The nearest government secondary school is Ingham State High School, also in Ingham.

== Attractions ==
Hinchinbrook Lookout is on Mount Cudmore Tower Road, off the Bruce Highway (18.5330°S 146.1889°E). It offers views across the Hinchinbrook Channel to Hinchinbrook Island.
