= Halifax, Queensland =

Halifax
- Town
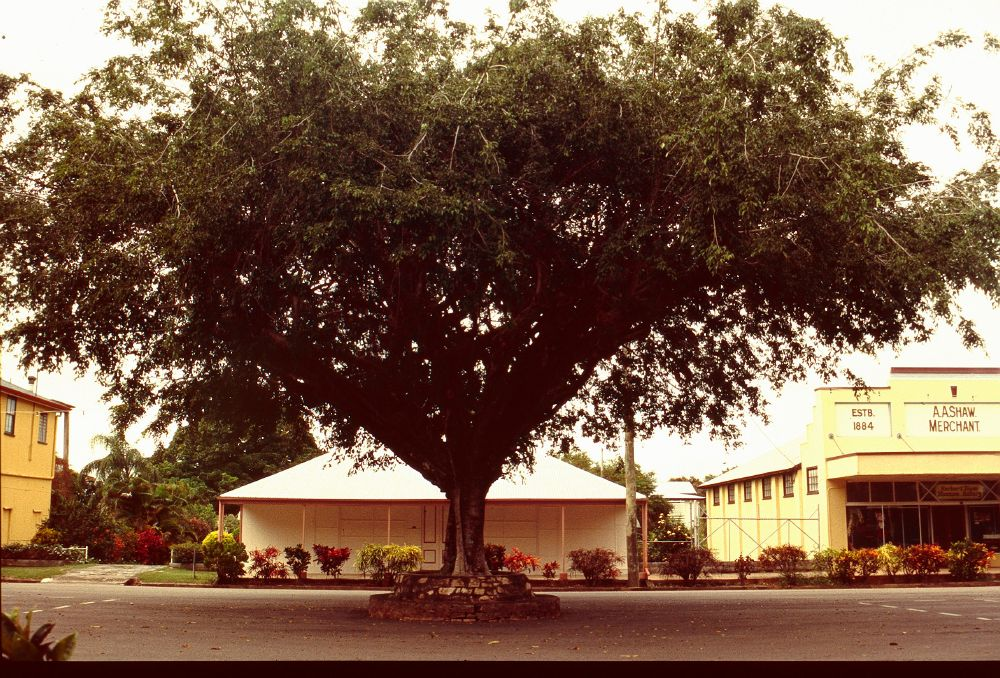
- Row of Street Trees, 2003

- Interactive map of Halifax
- Coordinates: 18.5822°S 146.2861°E
- Country: Australia
- State: Queensland
- LGA: Shire of Hinchinbrook
- Location: 18.7 km (11.6 mi) NE of Ingham; 130 km (81 mi) NW of Townsville; 235 km (146 mi) S of Cairns; 1,479 km (919 mi) NNW of Brisbane
- Established: 1880

Government
  - State electorate: Hinchinbrook
  - Federal division: Kennedy

Area
  - Total: 44.9 km^{2} (17.3 sq mi)

Population
  - Total: 477 (2021 census)
  - Density: 10.624/km^{2} (27.52/sq mi)
- Time zone: UTC+10:00 (AEST)
- Postcode: 4850
Localities around Halifax
Macknade	Lucinda	Lucinda
Macknade	Halifax	Coral Sea
Cordelia	Braemeadows	Taylors Beach

Halifax is a town and a coastal locality in the Shire of Hinchinbrook, Queensland, Australia. In the 2021 census, the locality of Halifax had a population of 477 people.

== Geography ==
Halifax is on the Herbert River, 15 kilometres (9 mi) northeast of Ingham.

== History ==
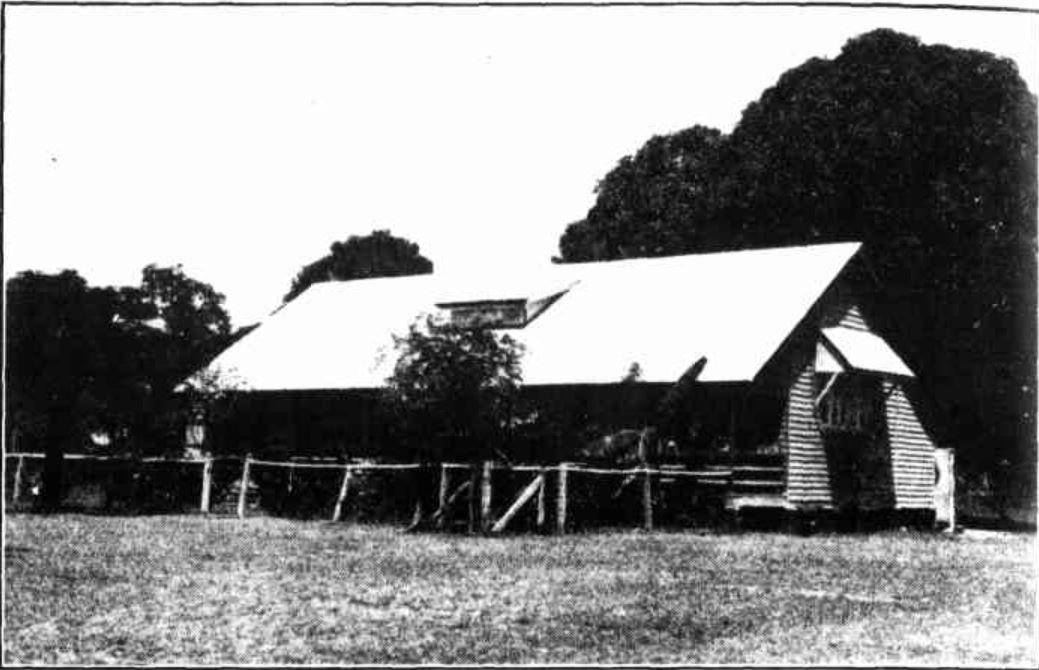
Halifax State School, 1931

August Anderssen, a blacksmith, purchased the land in 1880 after which time the land was turned into sugar plantations.

Herbert River Provisional School opened on 24 September 1883. It was renamed Halifax Provisional School in 1885. It became Halifax State School in 1891.

Halifax Post Office opened on 23 August 1886.

St Peter's Catholic School opened in 1927.

Halifax Methodist Church opened in 1964. When the Methodist Church amalgamated into the Uniting Church in Australia in 1977, it became Halifax Uniting Church.

Many homes in Halifax were flooded following extremely heavy rain in March 2018.

== Demographics ==
In the 2011 census, the locality of Halifax had a population of 431 people.

In the 2016 census, the locality of Halifax had a population of 462 people.

In the 2021 census, the locality of Halifax had a population of 477 people.

== Heritage listings ==
Halifax has a number of heritage-listed sites, including:

- Row of Street Trees, Macrossan Street (18.5808°S 146.2847°E)

== Amenities ==
The town has a town hall and regular community markets.

Hinchinbrook Shire Council operates a library service at Halifax. The library is on Macrossan Street and is open Monday, Wednesday, Friday and Saturday.

The Herbert River Museum is located on Macrossan Street in Halifax and is open 9am-12pm Tuesday to Saturday.

The Halifax branch of the Queensland Country Women's Association meets at the CWA Hall at 53 Macrossan Street.

Halifax Uniting Church is at 12 Anderssen Street (18.5826°S 146.2872°E). It is part of the North Queensland Presbytery of the Uniting Church in Australia.

== Education ==
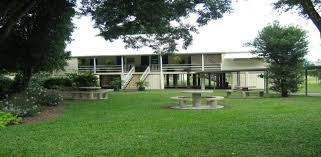
Halifax State School, 2022

Halifax State School is a government primary (Prep–6) school for boys and girls at 17 Victoria Terrace (18.5836°S 146.2846°E). In 2017, the school had an enrolment of 22 students with 4 teachers (2 full-time equivalent) and 4 non-teaching staff (2 full-time equivalent).

St Peter's Catholic School is a Catholic primary (Prep–6) school for boys and girls at 15–17 Anderssen Street (18.5822°S 146.2876°E). In 2017, the school had an enrolment of 37 students with 4 teachers (3 full-time equivalent) and 4 non-teaching staff (2 full-time equivalent).

There is no secondary school in Halifax; the nearest government secondary school is Ingham State High School in Ingham to the south-west.
