= Lucinda, Queensland =

Lucinda
- Town
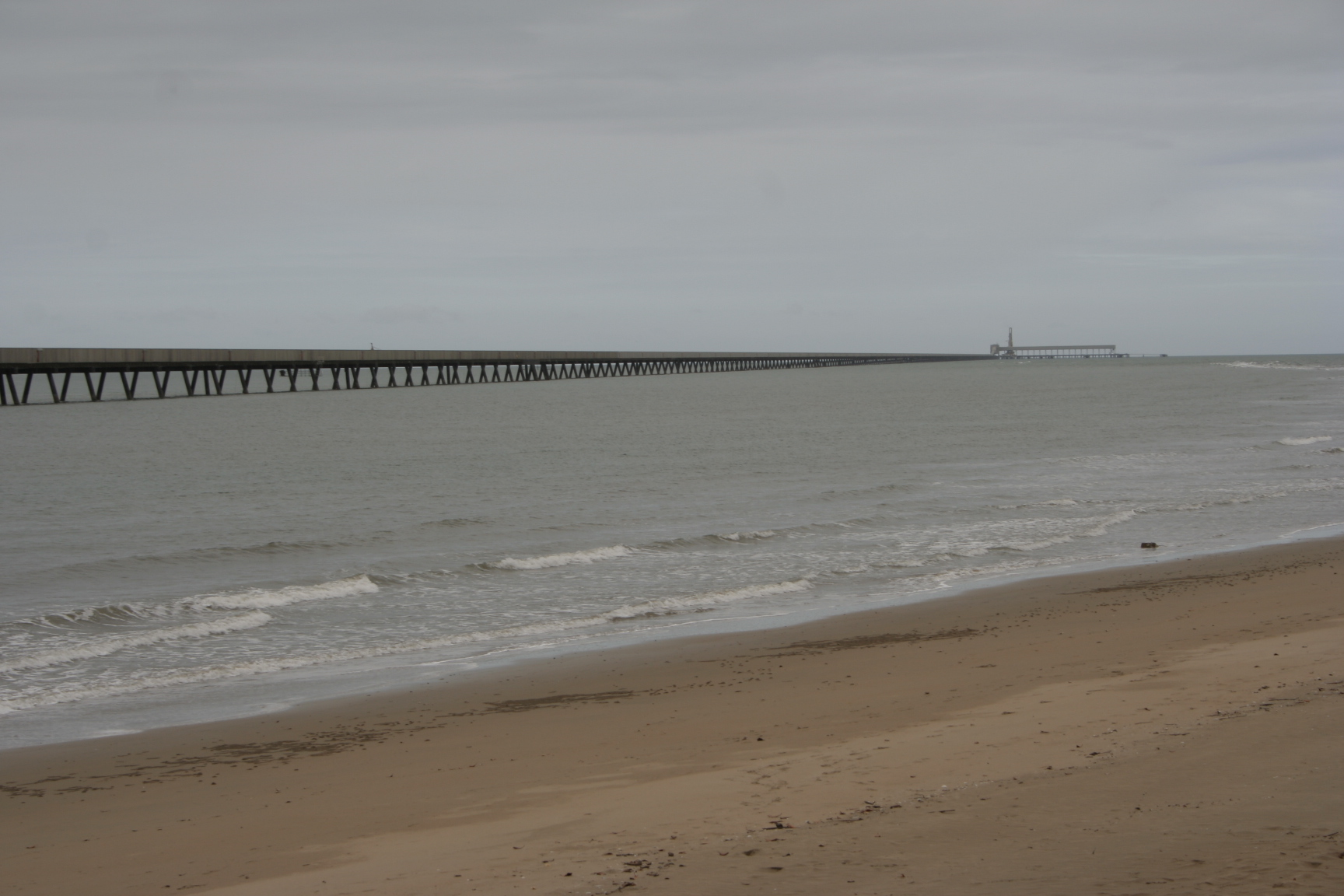
- Sugar-loading jetty, 2007

- Interactive map of Lucinda
- Coordinates: 18.5327°S 146.3347°E
- Country: Australia
- State: Queensland
- LGA: Shire of Hinchinbrook
- Location: 27.0 km (16.8 mi) NE of Ingham; 139 km (86 mi) NNW of Townsville; 1,470 km (910 mi) NNW of Brisbane

Government
  - State electorate: Hinchinbrook
  - Federal division: Kennedy

Area
  - Total: 77.8 km^{2} (30.0 sq mi)
- Elevation: 19 m (62 ft)

Population
  - Total: 435 (2021 census)
  - Density: 5.591/km^{2} (14.481/sq mi)
- Time zone: UTC+10:00 (AEST)
- Postcode: 4850
- Mean max temp: 27.1 °C (80.8 °F)
- Mean min temp: 22.4 °C (72.3 °F)
- Annual rainfall: 1,028.9 mm (40.51 in)
Localities around Lucinda
Hinchinbrook Channel	Hinchinbrook Channel	Coral Sea
Macknade	Lucinda	Coral Sea
Halifax	Halifax	Halifax

Lucinda is a coastal town and locality in the Shire of Hinchinbrook, Queensland, Australia. In the 2021 census, the locality of Lucinda had a population of 435 people.

== Geography ==
The locality is bounded to the east by the Coral Sea, to the north by the southern end of the Hinchinbrook Channel (which separates Hinchinbrook Island from mainland Queensland), to the west by the Herbert River which flows in the Seaforth Channel and then into the Hinchinbrook Channel, and to the south by Gentle Annie Creek which flows into the Coral Sea.

The cape Lucinda Point is the north-eastern corner of the locality (18.5269°S 146.3393°E). The town of Lucinda developed along the east coast from the point and extending south.

The Herbert River (18.5434°S 146.2898°E) flows into the sea in 3 different ways:

- the main outlet goes north into the Seaford Channel (18.5151°S 146.2727°E ) and then into the Hinchinbrook Channel (18.5007°S 146.2957°E)
- a second lesser outlet goes east into the Enterprise Channel (18.5295°S 146.3148°E) through the locality and then into the Coral Sea
- the small Gentle Annie Creek (18.5567°S 146.3229°E) provides another outflow further south-east into the Coral Sea.

The town of Dungeness (18.5267°S 146.3186°E) is 1.6 kilometres (0.99 mi) by road north-west of the town of Lucinda. Dungeness takes its name from Dungeness Creek, which, in turn, was named after headland Dungeness on the coast of Kent, England. Unlike the town of Lucinda, Dungeness faces west onto the Enterprise Channel.

=== Climate ===
Lucinda has a relatively dry tropical savanna climate (Köppen: Aw) with a hot wet season from November to April and a very warm dry season from May to October. The wettest recorded day was 16 December 2018 with 390.4 mm (15.37 in) of rainfall. Extreme temperatures ranged from 38.5 °C (101.3 °F) on 20 February 2019 to 11.2 °C (52.2 °F) on 20 July 1985.

Climate data for Lucinda Point (18.52°S 146.39°E) (10 m (33 ft) AMSL) (1980-2025)
Month	Jan	Feb	Mar	Apr	May	Jun	Jul	Aug	Sep	Oct	Nov	Dec	Year
Record high °C (°F)	37.0 (98.6)	38.5 (101.3)	35.9 (96.6)	33.1 (91.6)	31.0 (87.8)	29.9 (85.8)	28.4 (83.1)	29.5 (85.1)	32.5 (90.5)	31.0 (87.8)	34.4 (93.9)	37.0 (98.6)	38.5 (101.3)
Mean daily maximum °C (°F)	30.1 (86.2)	30.3 (86.5)	29.7 (85.5)	27.9 (82.2)	25.9 (78.6)	23.9 (75.0)	23.1 (73.6)	23.9 (75.0)	25.8 (78.4)	27.1 (80.8)	28.4 (83.1)	29.6 (85.3)	27.1 (80.9)
Mean daily minimum °C (°F)	25.3 (77.5)	25.2 (77.4)	24.8 (76.6)	23.4 (74.1)	21.3 (70.3)	19.0 (66.2)	18.1 (64.6)	18.8 (65.8)	20.9 (69.6)	22.9 (73.2)	24.3 (75.7)	25.3 (77.5)	22.4 (72.4)
Record low °C (°F)	19.7 (67.5)	18.7 (65.7)	21.0 (69.8)	16.7 (62.1)	13.9 (57.0)	11.7 (53.1)	11.2 (52.2)	12.5 (54.5)	13.0 (55.4)	14.0 (57.2)	20.4 (68.7)	20.3 (68.5)	11.2 (52.2)
Average precipitation mm (inches)	191.7 (7.55)	210.0 (8.27)	176.0 (6.93)	89.7 (3.53)	60.1 (2.37)	35.2 (1.39)	22.1 (0.87)	23.6 (0.93)	24.4 (0.96)	26.0 (1.02)	73.6 (2.90)	110.1 (4.33)	1,028.9 (40.51)
Average precipitation days (≥ 0.2 mm)	15.1	14.4	15.1	14.0	12.0	7.4	6.7	6.4	5.3	5.6	7.8	10.6	120.4
Source: Bureau of Meteorology (1980-2025)

== History ==
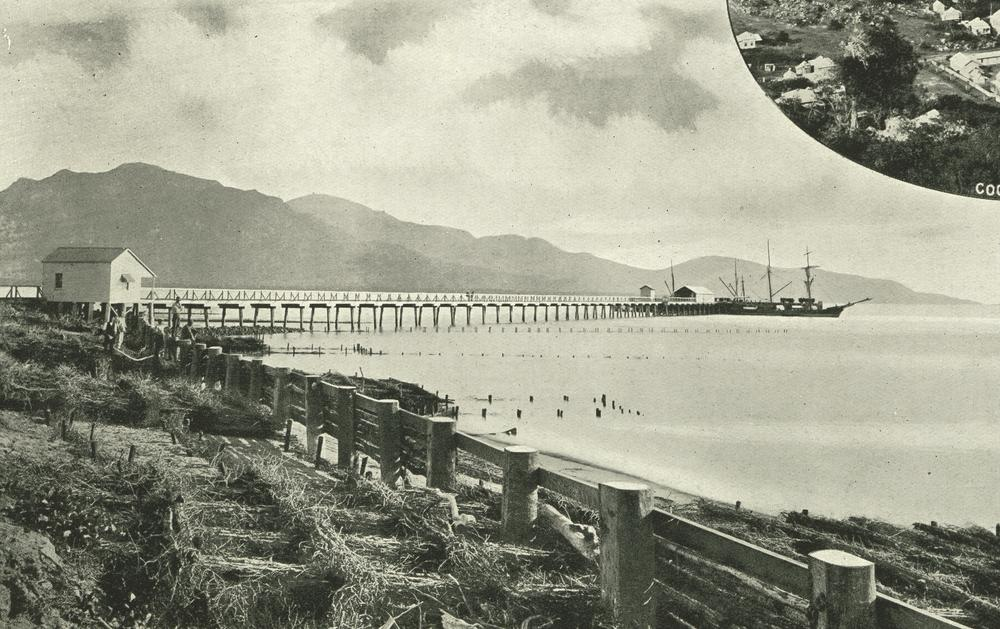
Jetty at Lucinda Point with Hinchinbrook Island in the background, circa 1905

The town was named after Lady Lucinda Musgrave, the wife of the Governor of Queensland, Sir Anthony Musgrave from 1883 to 1888, or the Queensland Government steam yacht, the Lucinda, that was in turn named after her.

In 1896, the Colonial Sugar Refining Company built a tramway from its Victoria sugar mill to Lucinda Point where the Queensland Government contracted the Rooney Brothers of Townsville built a storage shed and jetty. The existing harbour at Dungeness was not regarded as viable due to its shifting sandbanks. The current jetty was built in 1979. On Thursday 3 February 2011, the jetty suffered severe wave damage during Tropical Cyclone Yasi, but was repaired.

Lucinda Post Office opened on 6 October 1896.

Dungeness Provisional School opened in 1896. Due to problems with flooding, the school was moved to Lucinda Point in 1897 and in 1898 renamed as Lucinda Point Provisional School. On 1 January 1909, it became Lucinda Point State School. It was mothballed on 4 November 2008 and closed on 31 December 2008. It was at 20 Patterson Parade (corner Waring Street, 18.5306°S 146.3339°E). The school's website was archived.

== Demographics ==
In the 2006 census, the town of Lucinda had a population of 448 people.

In the 2016 census, the locality of Lucinda had a population of 406 people.

In the 2021 census, the locality of Lucinda had a population of 435 people.

== Economy ==
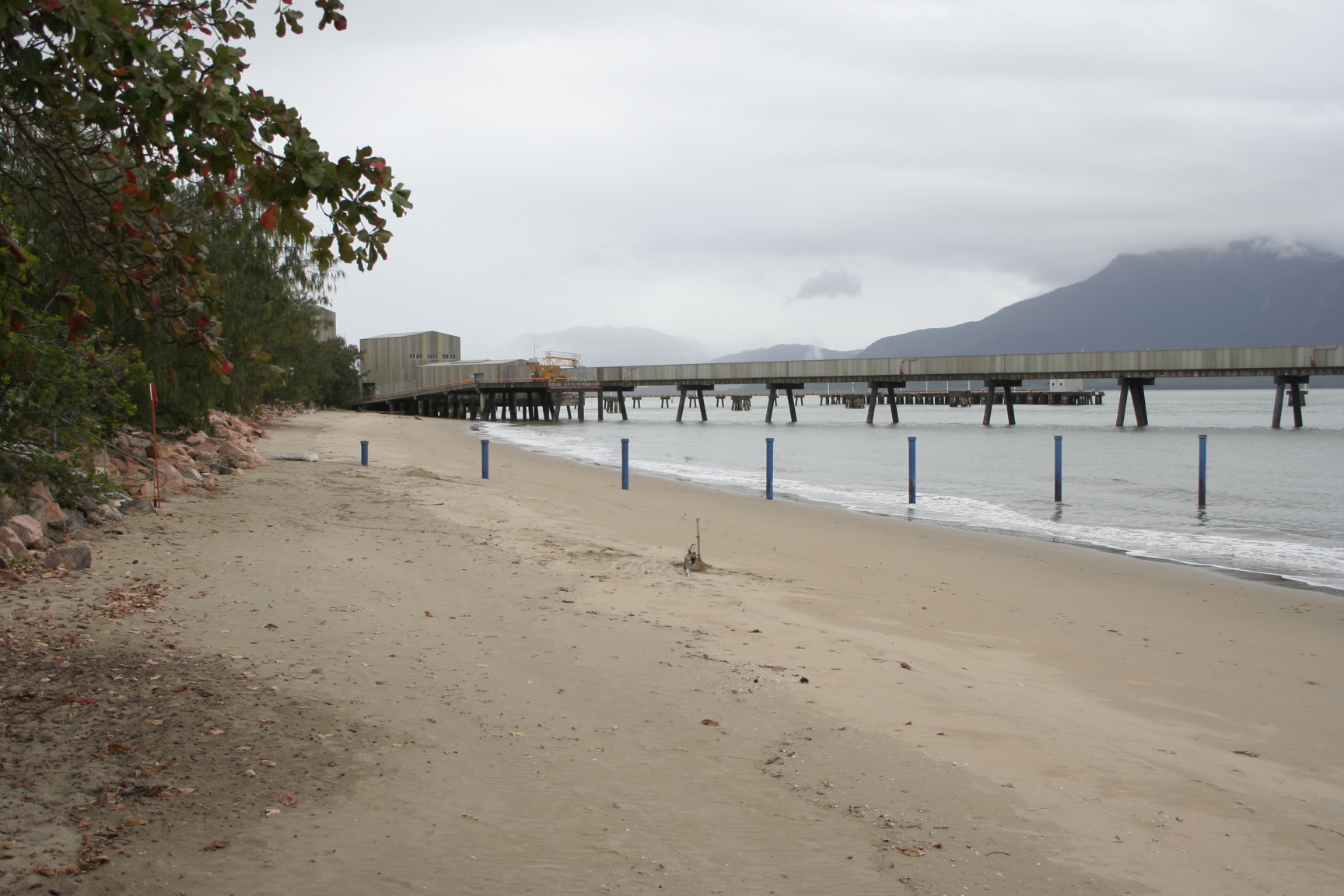
Jetty near the shore, 2007

A sugar-exporting town, Lucinda is noted for its 5.76-kilometre (3.58 mi) long sugar jetty, which is the longest jetty in the southern hemisphere and the world's largest bulk sugar loading facility (18.5202°S 146.3863°E). Due to its length, the jetty could not be built flat but follows the curvature of the Earth creating a difference of 2 metres (6 ft 7 in) between the two ends of the jetty. The jetty can accommodate Panamax-class ships and it takes 22 minutes for the sugar to travel the length of the jetty by conveyor belt. The sugar is supplied from the Victoria and Macnade sugar mills.

Lucinda is also used as a port for a supply barge to Palm Island.

== Education ==
There are no schools in Lucinda. The nearest government primary school is Halifax State School in neighbouring Halifax to the south. The nearest government secondary school is Ingham State High School in Ingham to the south-west.

== Amenities ==
Lucinda is serviced by a convenience store, the Hinchinbrook Marine Cove Resort on the waterfront on Dungeness Road, the Wanderers Village Resort on Bruce Parade and a hotel on Lucinda Point Road.

Ingham Coast Guard is a marine rescue facility at the junction of Patterson Parade and Warring Street (18.5301°S 146.3345°E).

There are two boat ramps managed by the Hinchinbrook Shire Council:

- on the Dungeness-Lucinda Road providing access to the Herbert River entrance (18.5235°S 146.3180°E)
- on Mona Road providing access to the Herbert River further inland (18.5513°S 146.2841°E)
