= Shire of Hinchinbrook =

Coordinates: 18°39′S 146°10′E

- Local government area
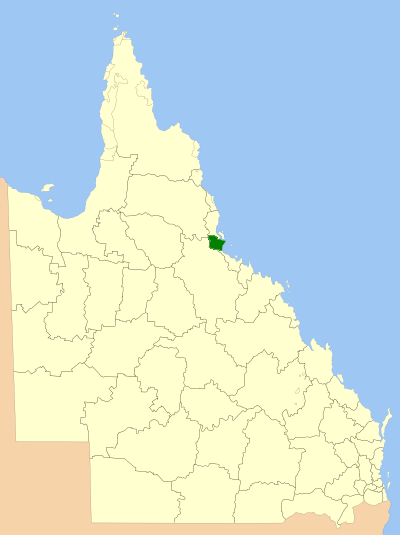
- Location within Queensland

- Interactive map of Shire of Hinchinbrook
- Country: Australia
- State: Queensland
- Region: North Queensland
- Established: 1879
- Council seat: Ingham

Government
  - Mayor: Ramon Jayo
  - State electorate: Hinchinbrook
  - Federal division: Kennedy

Area
  - Total: 2,807 km^{2} (1,084 sq mi)

Population
  - Total: 10,920 (2021 census)
  - Density: 3.8903/km^{2} (10.076/sq mi)
- Website: Shire of Hinchinbrook
LGAs around Shire of Hinchinbrook
Tablelands	Cassowary Coast	Coral Sea
Charters Towers	Shire of Hinchinbrook	Palm Island
Charters Towers	Charters Towers	Townsville

The Shire of Hinchinbrook is a local government area in North Queensland, Queensland, Australia. The shire, administered from the town of Ingham, covers an area of 2,807 square kilometres (1,083.8 sq mi), and has existed since its creation on 11 November 1879 as one of 74 divisions around Queensland under the Divisional Boards Act 1879.

The council consists of a mayor plus six councillors, each of whom represents the entire Shire. Prior to 2008, the council consisted of a mayor plus eight councillors.

In the 2021 census, the Shire of Hinchinbrook had a population of 10,920 people.

== History ==
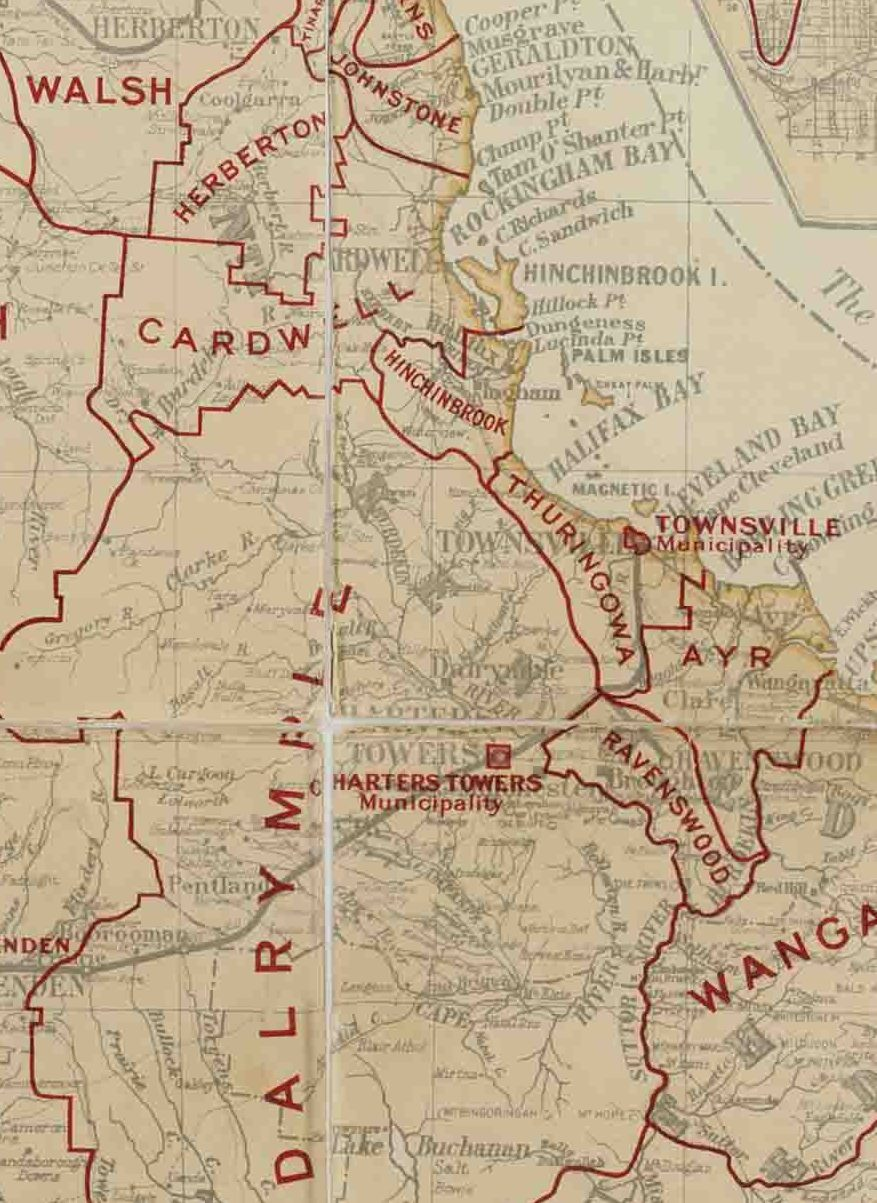
Map of Hinchinbrook Division and adjacent local government areas, March 1902

The Hinchinbrook Division was created on 11 November 1879 as one of 74 divisions around Queensland under the Divisional Boards Act 1879 with a population of 326. It originally covered a much larger area, extending well into the Tablelands Region.

On 3 September 1881, the Tinaroo Division was created on 3 September 1881 under the Divisional Boards Act 1879 out of parts of the Cairns, Hinchinbrook and Woothakata Divisions.

On 28 October 1881, part of Hinchinbrook Division was separated to create the Johnstone Division.

On 18 January 1884 part of Hinchinbrook Division was separated to create the Cardwell Division.

With the passage of the Local Authorities Act 1902, Hinchinbrook Division became Shire of Hinchinbrook on 31 March 1903.

Hinchinbrook was one of the few shires outside of remote areas in Queensland not to be affected by amalgamations in 2007–2008. It was considered for amalgamation into the Cassowary Coast Region with Cardwell and Johnstone, but the Local Government Commissioners accepted arguments by the council that there was no significant community of interest between the three, that amalgamation would not improve financial sustainability and that the resulting council would have a large north-south distance which would impact upon economies of scale.

== Shire hall ==
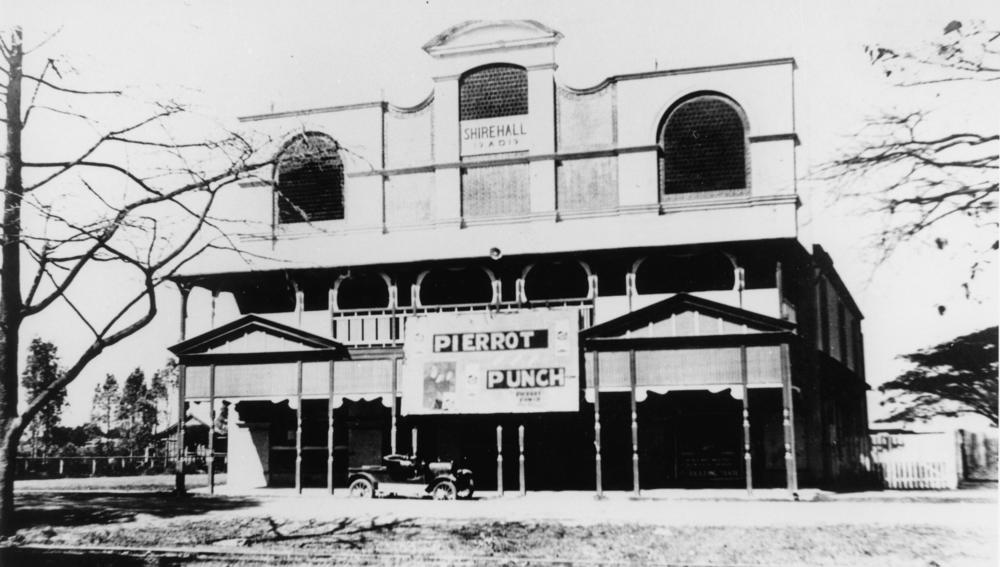
Shire Hall building, Ingham, ca. 1922

The first shire hall was constructed in 1883, but was destroyed by fire in May 1916. A new double-storey building was built at a different site in 1919. The present shire hall opened in 1963.

== Libraries ==
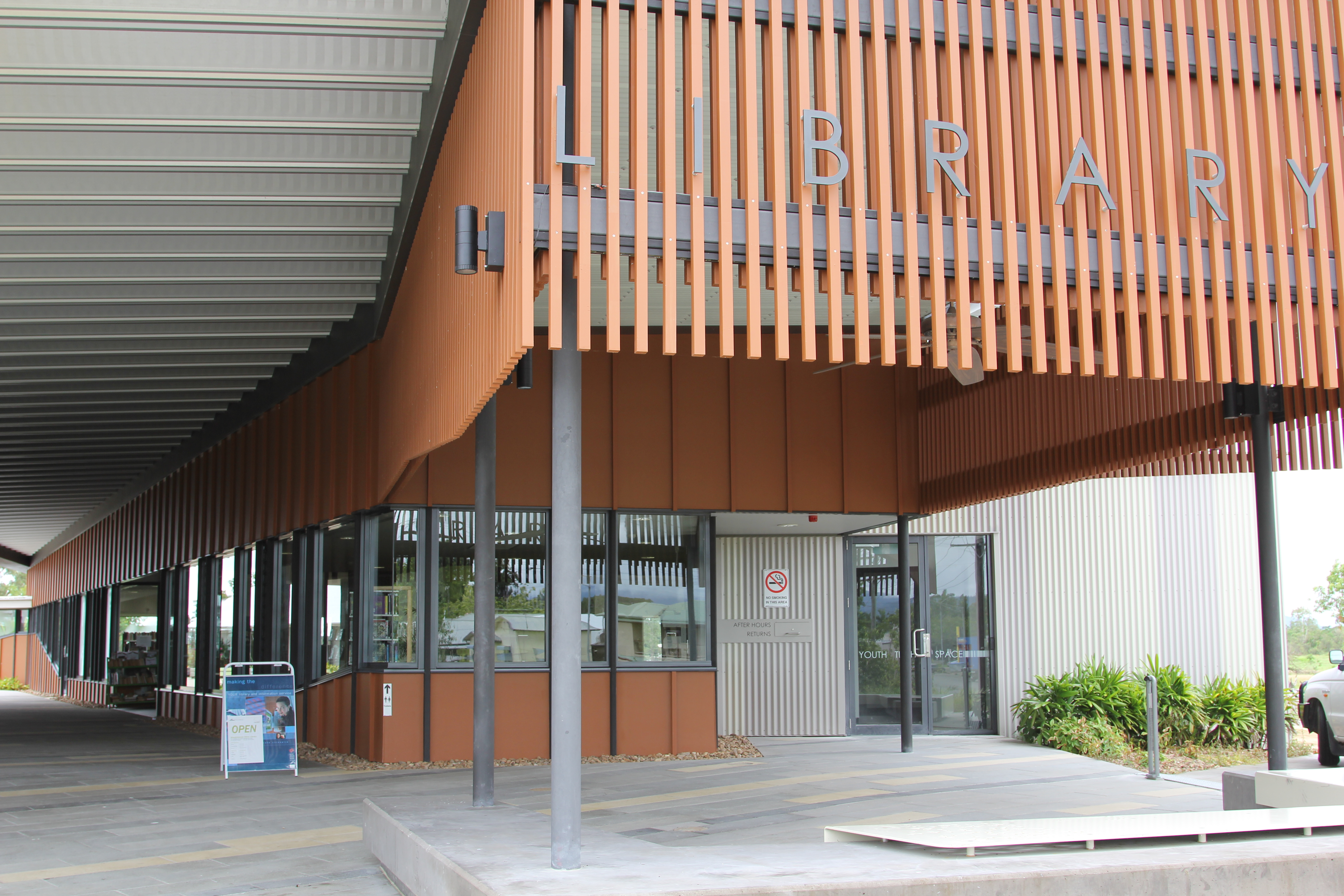
Hinchinbrook Shire Library, 2010

Hinchinbrook Shire Council operates public libraries at Ingham and Halifax.

== Towns and localities ==
The Shire of Hinchinbrook includes the following settlements:

- Abergowrie
- Bambaroo
- Bemerside
- Blackrock
- Braemeadows
- Cordelia
- Forrest Beach
- Gairloch
- Garrawalt
- Halifax
- Hawkins Creek
- Helens Hill
- Hinchinbrook
- Ingham
- Lannercost Extension
- Long Pocket
- Lucinda
- Macknade
- Mount Fox
- Stone River
- Taylors Beach
- Toobanna
- Trebonne
- Victoria Plantation
- Yuruga

== Demographics ==
Year	Population	Notes
1933	10,179	
1947	9,212	
1954	11,381	
1961	11,890	
1966	13,644	
1971	13,373	
1976	13,864	
1981	13,683	
1986	13,476	
1991	13,496	
1996	13,450	
2001 census	14,529	
2006 census	11,558	
2011 census	11,568	
2016 census	10,885	
2021 census	10,920	

In the 2021 census, the Hinchinbrook Shire had a population of 10,920 people. 34.4% described their ancestry as English. This is followed by 33.9% who described their ancestry as Australian, then Italian (27.6%), Irish (10.1%) and Scottish at 8.0%. 86.9% spoke only English at home followed by the next most common languages: 3.0% Italian, 0.2% Filipino, 0.2% Tagalog, 0.1% German and 0.1% Cantonese. Indigenous Australians were listed as making up 6.9% of the Hinchinbrook population.

== Chairmen and mayors ==
Chairmen of the Hinchinbrook Divisional Board

- 1880–1882: Frank Neame
- 1883–1886: Alfred Sandlings Cowley
- 1887: Henry Stone
- 1888: A. J. Traill (resigned)
- 1888–1892: W. T. White
- 1893: Arthur Gedge
- 1894: W. T. White (again)
- 1895–1899: Henry Stone (again)
- 1900: P. J. Cochrane
- 1901–1902: Arthur Gedge (again)

Chairmen of the Hinchinbrook Shire Council

- 1903: Frank Fraser
- 1904–1905: R.G. Johnson (resigned)
- 1905–1909: Francis Andrew O'Connor Cassady
- 1910–1913: Martin Flynn (resigned)
- 1913–1915: Francis Andrew O'Connor Cassady (again)
- 1916–1920: J. W. Cartwright
- 1921–1936: Francis Andrew O'Connor Cassady (again, died 23 March 1936)
- 1936: F. J. Heard (temporary)
- 1936–1942: James Lawrence Kelly
- 1943–1945: F. N. Alston
- 1946–1954: James Lawrence Kelly (again)
- 1955–1977: W. O. Garbutt (died)
- May 1977 – 1981 : S. Cavallaro
- 1982–1984: A. J. Andrews
- 1985–1987: J. J. Williams
- 1988–1993 : R. S. Brown

Mayors of Hinchinbrook Shire

- 1994–1999 : Giuseppantonio (Pino) Giandomenico
- 2000–2003 : Keith Thomas Phillips
- 2004–2011: Giuseppantonio (Pino) Giandomenico
- 2012–2016 : Mansell (Rodger) Bow
- 2016–present: Ramon Jayo

== Council ==
Hinchinbrook Shire Council

Type
- Type: Unicameral

Leadership
- Mayor: Ramon Jayo, Independent
- Deputy Mayor: Mary Brown, Independent

Structure
- Seats: 7 elected representatives, including a Mayor and 6 councillors
- Political groups: Majority: Independent (6); Minority: Liberal National (1)

Elections
- Last election: 28 March 2020
- Next election: 16 March 2024

Below is the current council, elected in 2024:

Names	Party	Notes
Mary Brown	Independent	Deputy Mayor
Andrew Carr	Independent	
Ramon Jayo	Independent	Mayor
Patrick Lynch	Independent	
Donna Marbelli	Independent	
Kate Milton	Liberal National	
Mark Spina	Independent	
