= Macknade, Queensland =

Macknade
- Town
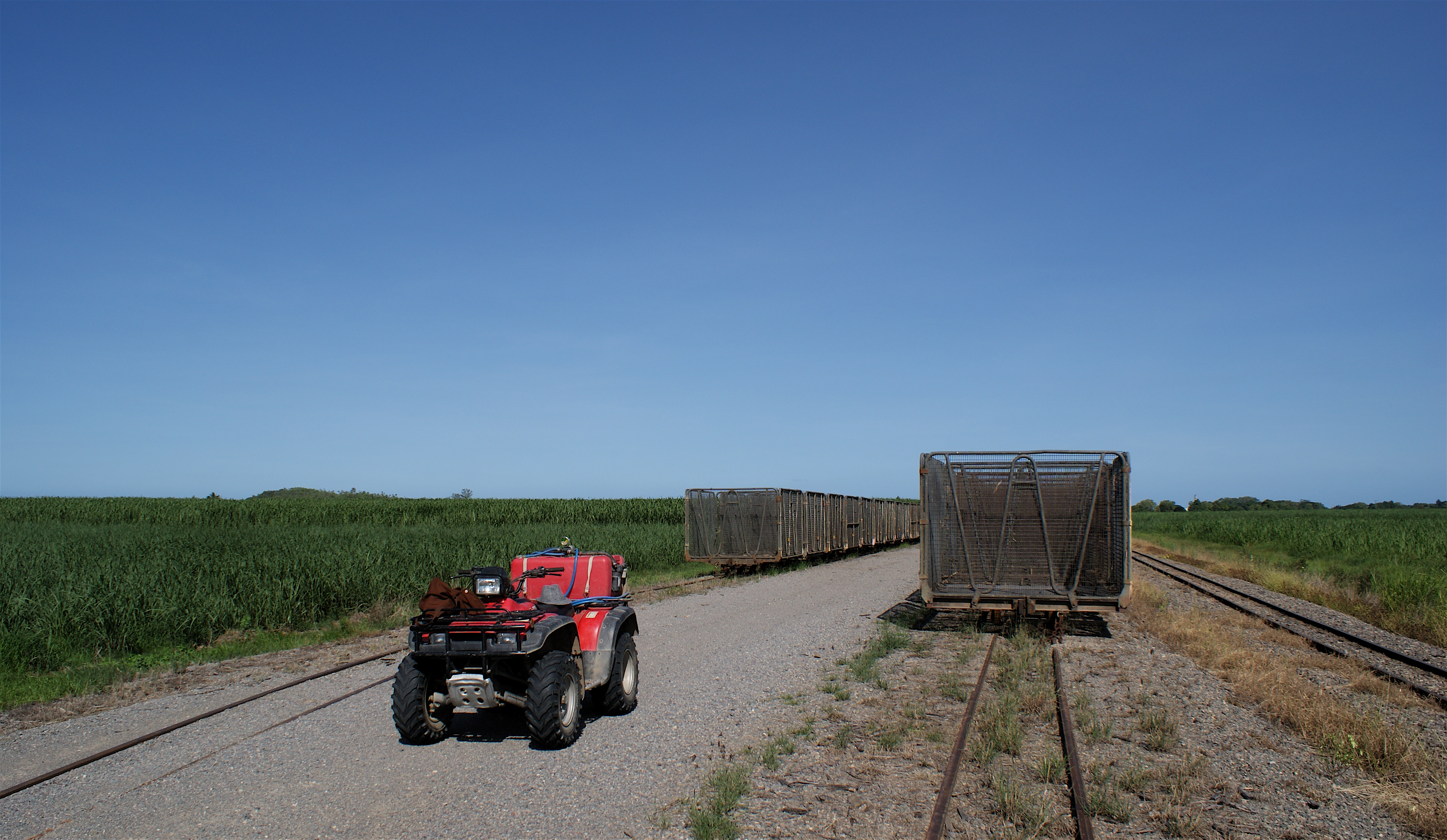
- Transporting harvested sugarcane on a cane tramway to the sugar mill, 2008

- Interactive map of Macknade
- Coordinates: 18.5766°S 146.2552°E
- Country: Australia
- State: Queensland
- LGA: Shire of Hinchinbrook
- Location: 16.1 km (10.0 mi) NE of Ingham; 129 km (80 mi) NW of Townsville; 1,459 km (907 mi) NNW of Brisbane

Government
  - State electorate: Hinchinbrook
  - Federal division: Kennedy

Area
  - Total: 67.0 km^{2} (25.9 sq mi)

Population
  - Total: 203 (2021 census)
  - Density: 3.030/km^{2} (7.847/sq mi)
- Time zone: UTC+10:00 (AEST)
- Postcode: 4850
Localities around Macknade
Rungoo	Hinchinbrook Channel	Hinchinbrook Channel
Bemerside	Macknade	Lucinda
Cordelia	Cordelia	Halifax

Macknade is a rural town and coastal locality in the Shire of Hinchinbrook, Queensland, Australia. In the 2021 census, the locality of Macknade had a population of 203 people.

== Geography ==
Macknade is bounded by the Herbert River (18.5333°S 146.3°E) on the south and east, the Seymour River (18.5166°S 146.2°E) on the west and the Hinchinbrook Channel (18.4936°S 146.2496°E) to the north (separating the mainland from Hinchinbrook Island).

Seaforth Channel is another off-shore passage (18.5151°S 146.2727°E).

== History ==
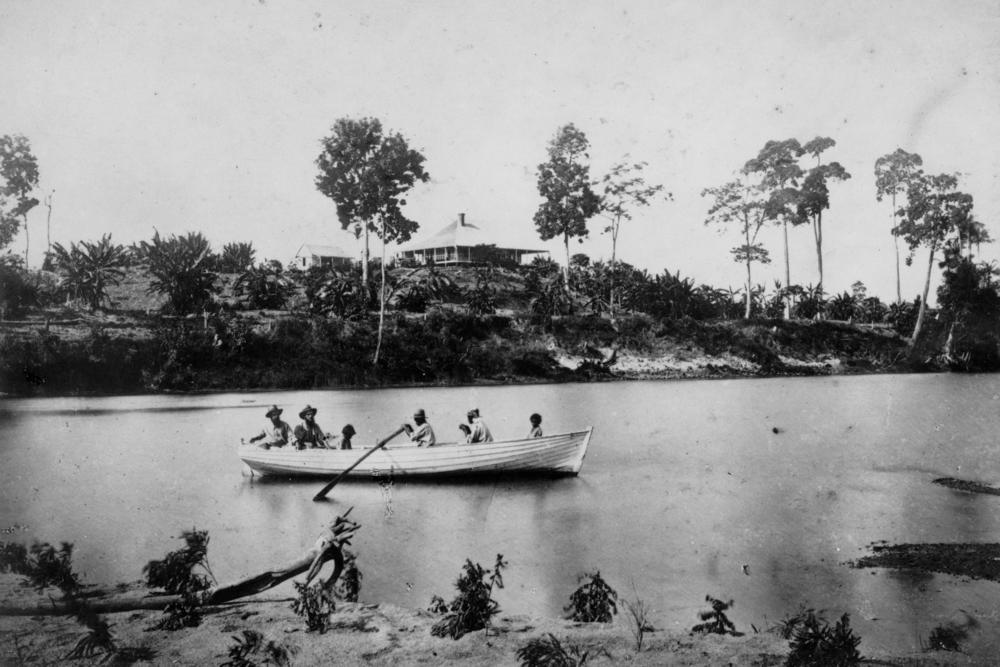
Macknade sugar plantation viewed from the Herbert River, 1874

The Macknade Sugar Company opened a sugar plantation and the Macknade Sugar Mill in the area in 1874. The district took its name from the mill, which in turn took its name from a house in Kent, England where the mill's owners had lived.

Macknade Provisional School opened on 13 November 1893. On 1 January 1909, it became Macknade State School.

The postal receiving office opened in about 1901 and became a post office in October 1902. The post office closed on 29 October 1993.

== Demographics ==
In the 2011 census, the locality of Macknade had a population of 304 people.

In the 2016 census, the locality of Macknade had a population of 229 people.

In the 2021 census, the locality of Macknade had a population of 203 people.

== Economy ==
The Macknade Sugar Mill (18.5870°S 146.2567°E) is situated on the banks of the Herbert River. It is the oldest raw sugar mill in Queensland. Its highest output was in 2005 when it crushed 1.82 million tonnes of sugar cane.

The estuarine location of Macknade is well-suited for sugar growing, but it is also well-suited for aquaculture with Seafarms operating a large prawn-farming business on Neames Inlet Road (18.5323°S 146.2387°E).

== Education ==
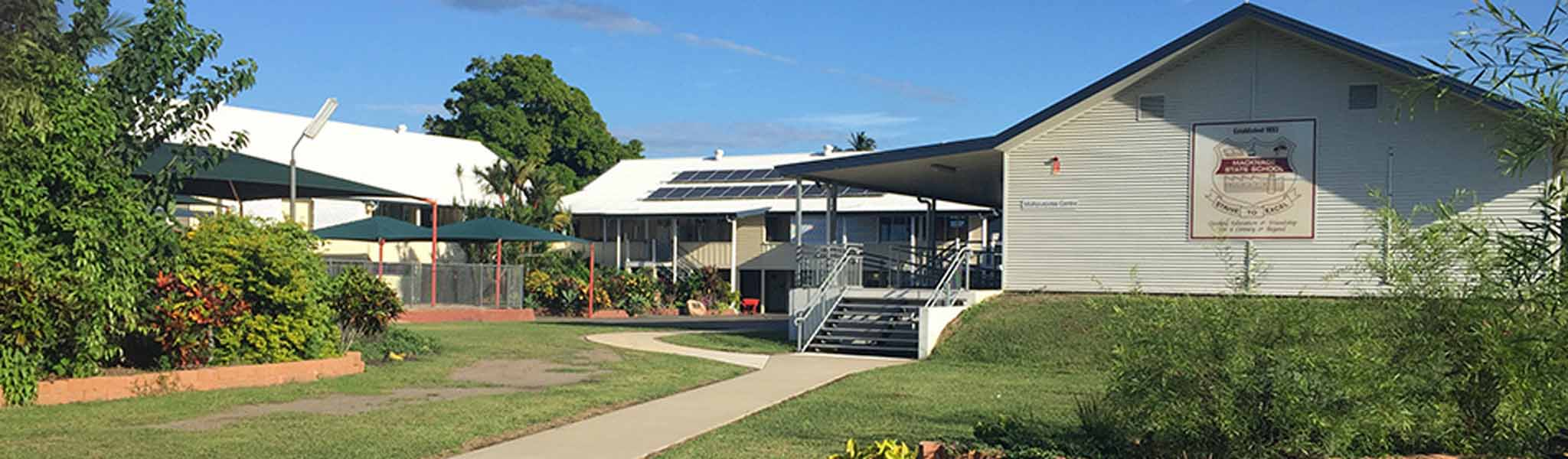
Macknade State School, 2020

Macknade State School is a government primary (Prep-6) school for boys and girls at 79 Farrell Drive (18.5767°S 146.2518°E). In 2018, the school had an enrolment of 26 students with 6 teachers (3 full-time equivalent) and 4 non-teaching staff (2 full-time equivalent).

There is no secondary school in Macknade. The nearest government secondary school is Ingham State High School in Ingham to the south-west.

== See also ==
- List of tramways in Queensland
