= County of Cardwell, Queensland =

Cardwell Queensland
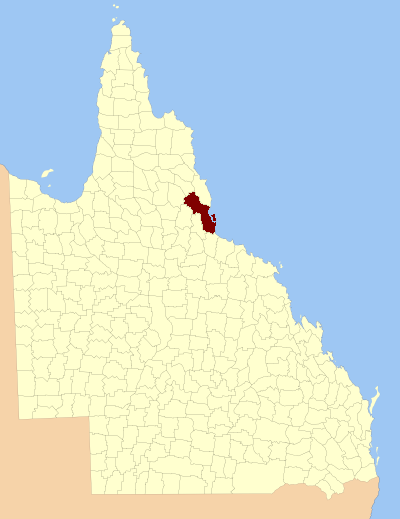
- Location within Queensland
Lands administrative divisions around Cardwell:
Hodgkinson	Nares	Coral Sea
Lynd	Cardwell	Coral Sea
Gunnawarra	Wairuna	Wilkie Gray

The County of Cardwell is a county (a cadastral division) in Far North Queensland, Queensland, Australia, between Cairns and Townsville. It was named and bounded by the Governor in Council on 7 March 1901 under the Land Act 1897. Its name likely honours Edward Cardwell, who was Secretary of State for the Colonies in 1864–1866 and later served as a reformist Secretary of State for War.

== Parishes ==
Cardwell is divided into parishes, as listed below:

Parish	LGA	Coordinates	Towns
Alcock	Cassowary Coast	17°48′S 145°45′E	
Armstrong	Tablelands	18°05′S 145°23′E	
Ashton	Hinchinbrook	18°37′S 145°50′E	
Bankton	Cassowary Coast	18°01′S 145°38′E	
Berwick	Hinchinbrook	18°46′S 146°02′E	
Blencoe	Tablelands	18°07′S 145°35′E	Kirrama
Coolgarra	Tablelands	17°35′S 145°10′E	
Cordelia	Hinchinbrook	18°38′S 146°15′E	Ingham, Halifax, Lucinda
Dunkalli	Cassowary Coast	17°59′S 146°10′E	Dunk Island
Ellerbeck	Cassowary Coast	18°19′S 146°03′E	Cardwell
Garrawalt	Hinchinbrook	18°28′S 145°50′E	Abergowrie
Glenbora	Cassowary Coast	18°16′S 145°54′E	
Goshen	Tablelands	18°11′S 145°24′E	
Hecate	Cassowary Coast	18°13′S 146°12′E	
Herberton	Tablelands	17°26′S 145°25′E	Herberton
Ismailia	Tablelands	17°48′S 145°30′E	
Kirrama	Cassowary Coast	18°10′S 145°43′E	
Lannercost	Hinchinbrook	18°36′S 145°59′E	Long Pocket
Leach	Hinchinbrook	18°27′S 146°00′E	
Leefe	Cassowary Coast	18°21′S 145°55′E	
Marathon	Hinchinbrook	18°34′S 146°10′E	Macknade
Meunga	Cassowary Coast	18°09′S 145°54′E	Kennedy
Millstream	Tablelands	17°43′S 145°20′E	
Morecambe	Tablelands	17°50′S 145°05′E	
Mullaburra	Tablelands	17°42′S 145°07′E	Mount Garnet
Niagara	Tablelands	18°19′S 145°45′E	
Ongera	Tablelands	17°43′S 145°37′E	
Palm	Hinchinbrook	18°42′S 146°33′E	Palm Island
Pitt	Cassowary Coast	18°26′S 146°09′E	
Ramleh	Tablelands	17°53′S 145°38′E	
Ravenshoe	Tablelands	17°38′S 145°30′E	Ravenshoe, Tumoulin
Rockingham	Cassowary Coast	17°56′S 145°57′E	Tully
Silver Valley	Charters Towers	17°28′S 145°17′E	
Stone	Hinchinbrook	18°48′S 145°53′E	Upper Stone
Straloch	Cassowary Coast	18°25′S 146°18′E	
Timsah	Tablelands	17°57′S 145°30′E	
Tirrabella	Tablelands	17°49′S 145°19′E	
Trebonne	Hinchinbrook	18°43′S 146°12′E	Ingham, Trebonne, Toobanna
Tyson	Cassowary Coast	18°03′S 145°53′E	Euramo
Waterview	Hinchinbrook	18°54′S 146°11′E	Paluma, Bambaroo
Woodleigh	Tablelands	17°35′S 145°24′E	
Woomunda	Tablelands	17°38′S 145°16′E	Innot Hot Springs
Yourka	Tablelands	17°56′S 145°20′E	
