= North Queensland =

Region of Queensland, Australia

Coordinates: 20°15′40″S 146°01′12″E

- Region
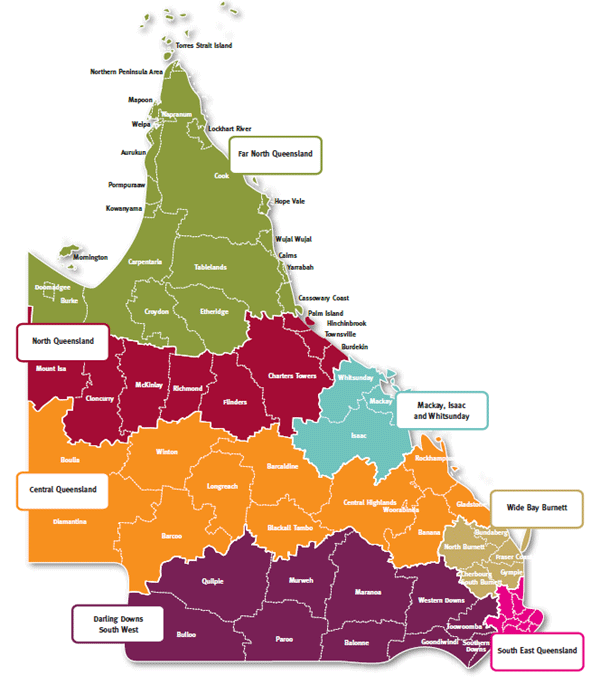
- Queensland's regions
- Country: Australia
- State: Queensland
- LGA: Burdekin; Charters Towers; Hinchinbrook; Mackay; Palm Island; Townsville

Government
  - State electorate: * Burdekin; Hinchinbrook; Mackay; Mundingburra; Thuringowa; Townsville; Whitsunday
  - Federal division: * Dawson; Herbert; Kennedy

Area
  - Total: 80,041.5 km^{2} (30,904.2 sq mi)

Population
  - Total: 231,628 (2011)
  - Density: 2.893849/km^{2} (7.495034/sq mi)

North Queensland or the Northern Region is the northern part of the Australian state of Queensland that lies just south of Far North Queensland. Queensland has a vast area, slightly more than the 17th largest country. Its tropical northern part has been historically remote and undeveloped, resulting in a distinctive regional character and identity. The region is prone to floods and cyclones.

As of 2012, the region had a population of 231,628 and covered 80,041.5 km^{2} (30,904.2 sq mi).

== Geography ==
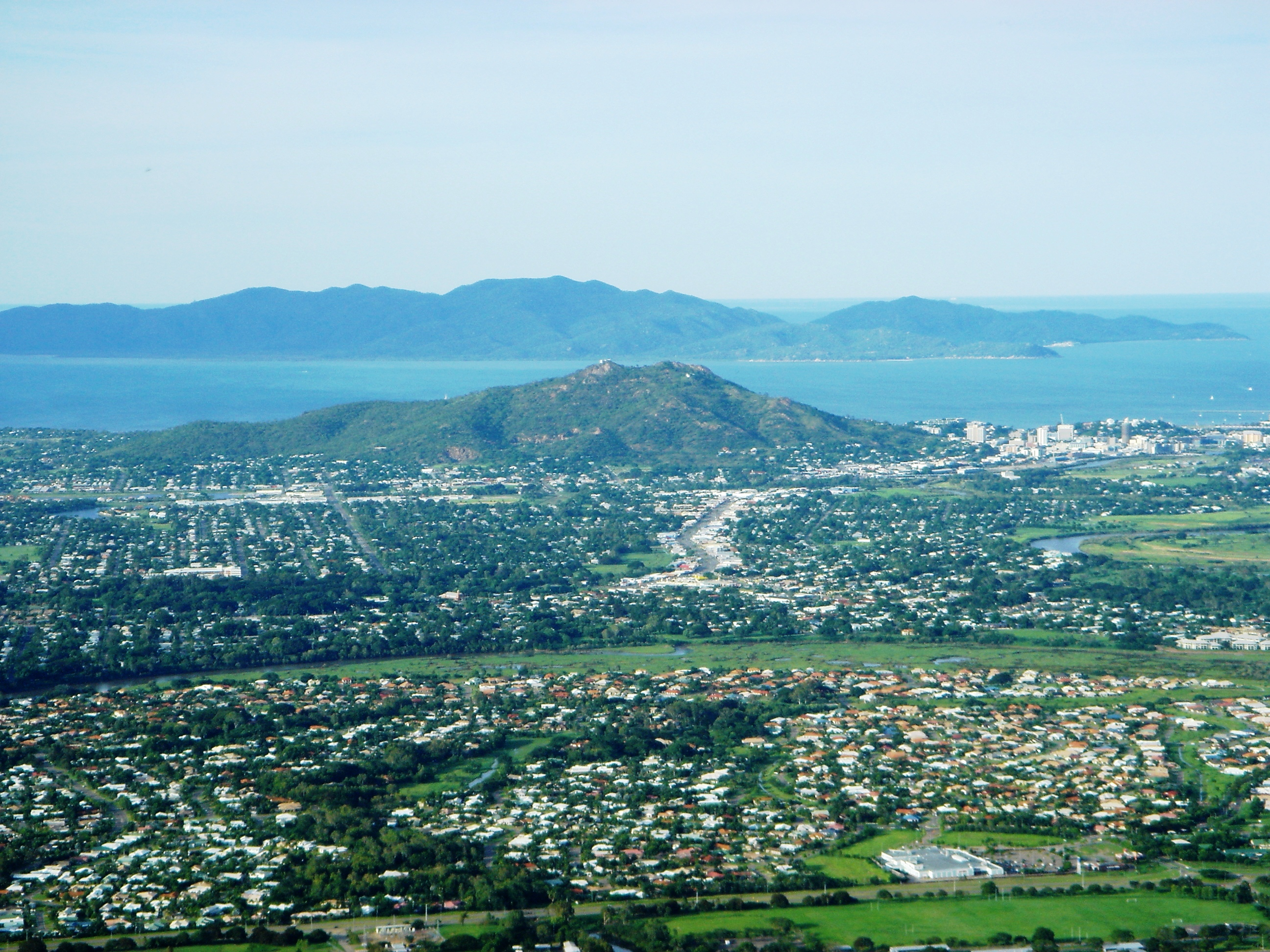
Suburbs of Townsville around Castle Hill

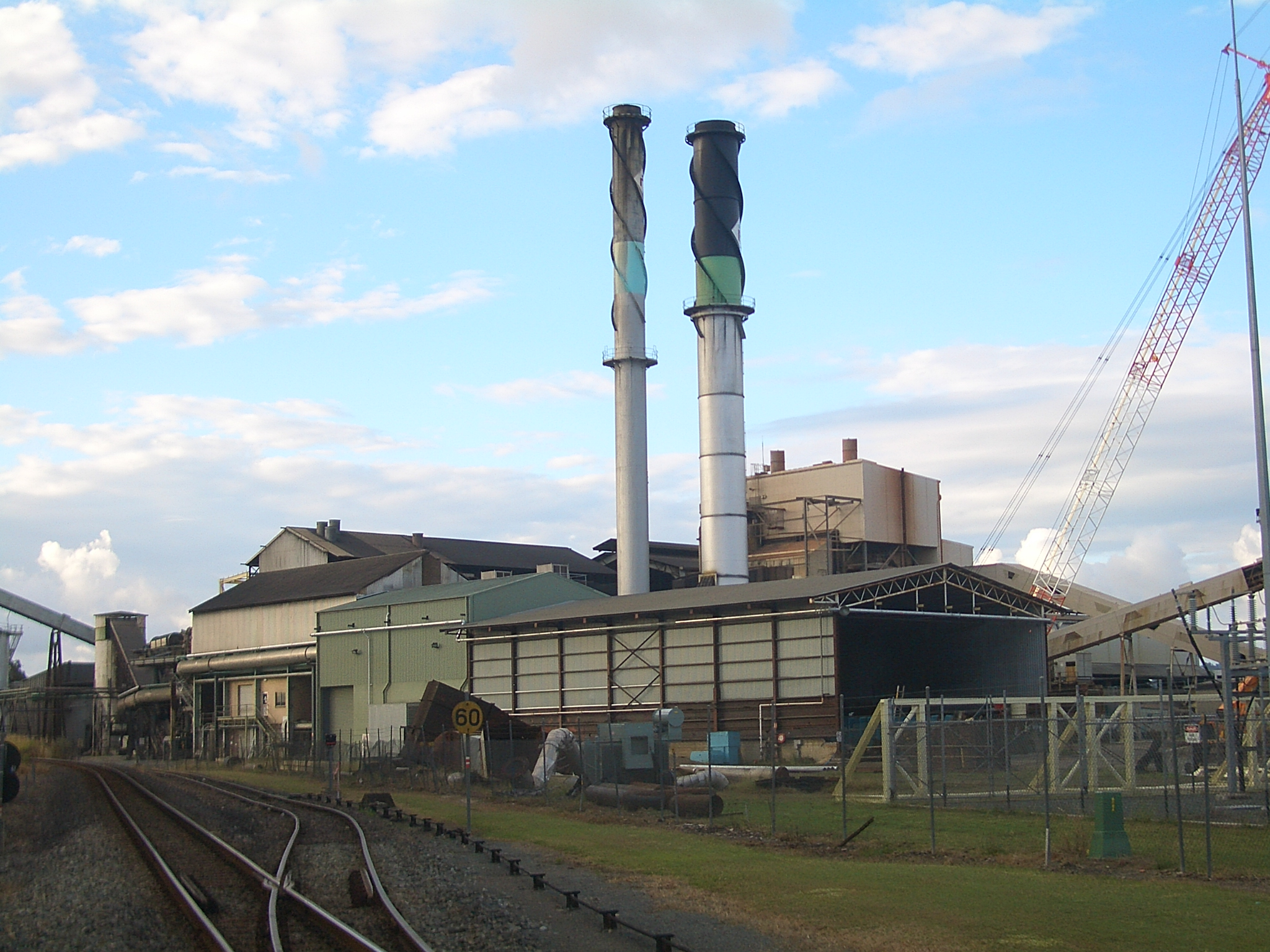
There a number of sugar mills in the region, including one at Proserpine

There is no official boundary that separates North Queensland from the rest of the state. Unofficially it is usually considered to have a southern border beginning south of the Mackay Region southern boundary, but historically it has been as far south as Rockhampton. To the north is the Far North Queensland region, centred on Cairns and out west is the Gulf Country.

A coastal region centred on its largest settlement is the city of Townsville. The city is the location of a major seaport handling exports from mines in Mount Isa and cattle exports from coastal and inland areas. The region also contains a bulk sugar exporting terminal at Lucinda in the region's north. Mackay and the Burdekin region are Australia's sugar capital and produces the most sugar in Australia and is shipped at Mackay Harbour. Mackay is also one of Australia's biggest coal exporters as it is close to Queensland's major mines. Abbot Point, north of Bowen, is a large, coal exporting port. Dalrymple Bay, south of Mackay is another port where coal is exported. It also contains the inland city of Charters Towers and the coastal towns of Ayr and Ingham. The Burdekin is centred on the two towns of Ayr and Home Hill and while producing the largest amount of sugar, also produces seasonal fruit such as Lychees and Mangos in summer, which is the wet season.

Other communities in North Queensland include Home Hill, Sarina, Bowen, Ayr, and Proserpine. Hinchinbrook Island is the largest island on the Great Barrier Reef and the largest island national park in Australia. Great Palm Island is home to the largest discreet Indigenous community in Australia. Wallaman Falls located near Wallaman, is Australia's highest, permanent single-drop waterfall.

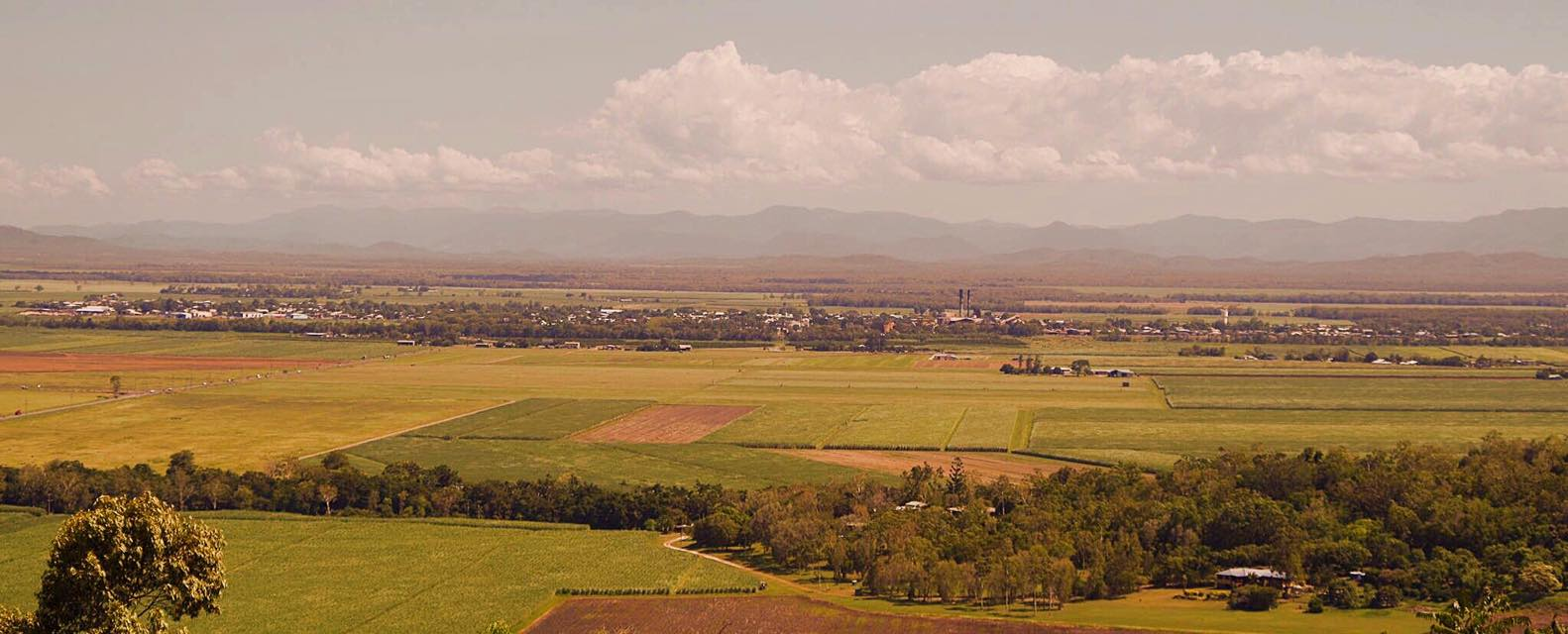
Proserpine, a town in North Queensland and gateway to the Whitsunday Region. A potential site for government buildings for a future NQ state.

== History ==
Gugu Badhun (also known as Koko-Badun and Kokopatun) is an Australian Aboriginal language of North Queensland. The language region includes areas within the local government area of Charters Towers Region, particularly the localities of Greenvale and the Valley of Lagoons, and in the Upper Burdekin River area and in Abergowrie.

Warrgamay (also known as Waragamai, Wargamay, Wargamaygan, Biyay, and Warakamai) is an Australian Aboriginal language in North Queensland. The language region includes the Herbert River area, Ingham, Hawkins Creek, Long Pocket, Herbert Vale, Niagara Vale, Yamanic Creek, Herbert Gorge, Cardwell, Hinchinbrook Island and the adjacent mainland.

Yuru (also known as Juru, Euronbba, Juru, Mal Mal, Malmal) is an Australian Aboriginal language spoken on Yuru country. The Yuru language region includes the landscape within the local government boundaries of the Shire of Burdekin, including the town of Home Hill.

Captain James Cook passed by the region in 1770, naming several places including Magnetic Island and Cape Cleveland. Allan Cunningham was the first European to explore parts of the region. John Mackay explored the Pioneer Valley near Mackay in 1860.

The first settlement in the region was established at Port Denison in 1861, at what is now known as Bowen. In 1865, the first surveys of what was to become Townsville were conducted. In 1871, gold was discovered at Charters Towers. This led to much development for the town and for Townsville which served as a major port and service centre as both the pastoral and sugar industry spread along the coast. Work on the Great Northern Railway from Townsville to Mount Isa began in 1879 with a small section opening the following year.

An Immigration Port was established at Bowen in 1866. This was because Queensland sugar plantations relied heavily on Pacific Island labour. At first blackbirding was standard practice, until the trade became voluntary. Over 40 years about 60,000 kanakas were brought to Queensland to work.

In July 1942, Japanese naval flying boats conducted air raids on Townsville.

The Perc Tucker Regional Gallery was established at Townsville in 1981 and the TYTO Regional Art Gallery at Ingham opened in 2011.

The North Queensland Cowboys entered the Australian Rugby League in 1995.

== Tourism ==
The region has a number of significant tourist attractions including the Great Barrier Reef and reef islands, rainforests in the Wet Tropics of Queensland, Eungella, Magnetic Island, and the Whitsunday Islands. The region has 36 national parks.

== Agriculture ==
The region produces 90% of Australia's bananas. Other important products include sugar cane, mangoes and livestock such as cattle.

== Transport ==
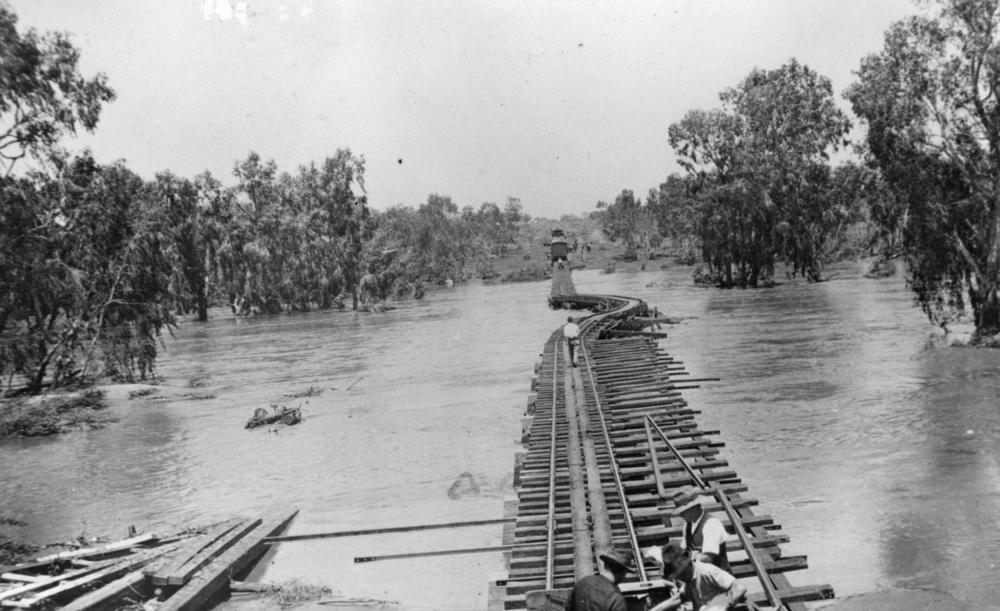
Flooding disrupts the Great Northern Railway in the 1930s

The region is serviced by Townsville Airport which is ranked as the 11th busiest airport in Australia. The airport was granted international status in 1980 and plans to return to international services in 2025. Along the coast, the Bruce Highway passes from the south through to the north of the region. The Flinders Highway links Townsville with Charters Towers and the Peak Downs Highway extends west from Mackay. The Tilt Train and Spirit of Queensland travel the North Coast railway line along the coast.

== Proposed State of North Queensland ==
Throughout the years, there have been many calls for the formation of a new state. Many proposals have been drawn up, regarding the borders, name and the debate over which town will become the capital (options include Mackay, Townsville City, or Cairns).

== See also ==
- List of schools in North Queensland
- List of regions of Australia
