= County of Cardwell =

County of Cardwell may refer to:

- County of Cardwell, Queensland, Australia
- County of Cardwell (South Australia)
