= County of Banks, Queensland =

Banks Queensland
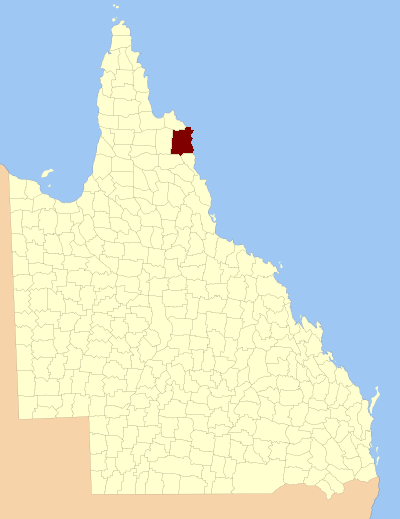
- Location within Queensland
Lands administrative divisions around Banks:
Melville	Melville
Mosman	Banks	Coral Sea
Chelmsford	Dagmar	Solander

The county of Banks is one of the counties of Queensland, Australia, that existed before 1901. The county is divided into civil parishes. It is located in Far North Queensland, and is named for Sir Joseph Banks, who with Captain James Cook landed in 1770 at a location within the county. Banks includes the towns of Cooktown, Lakeland and Laura.

== Parishes ==
Parish	LGA	Coordinates	Notes
Annan	Cook	15°35′S 145°15′E	
Battle Camp	Cook	15°22′S 144°39′E	
Bullhead	Cook	15°50′S 144°49′E	Lakeland
Cahir	Cook	15°12′S 144°39′E	
Cook	Cook	15°30′S 145°14′E	Cooktown
Cowton	Cook	14°59′S 144°52′E	
Deighton	Cook	15°30′S 144°33′E	Laura
Discovery	Hope Vale (A)	15°13′S 145°11′E	
Emla	Cook	15°20′S 144°31′E	
Endeavour	Hope Vale (A)	15°21′S 145°15′E	
Flattery	Hope Vale (A)	14°54′S 145°11′E	
Gore	Cook	15°52′S 145°04′E	
Green	Cook	15°32′S 144°56′E	
Gresley	Cook	15°47′S 144°30′E	
Hann	Hope Vale (A)	15°20′S 145°07′E	Hope Vale
Hicks	Cook	15°34′S 145°05′E	
Lythe	Cook	14°57′S 144°40′E	
Macquarie	Cook	15°39′S 144°34′E	
McIvor	Cook	15°07′S 145°03′E	
Melsonby	Cook	15°07′S 144°51′E	
Monkhouse	Cook	15°45′S 145°17′E	
Munburra	Cook	14°53′S 145°04′E	
Ninda	Cook	15°38′S 144°46′E	
Pickersgill	Cook	15°18′S 144°56′E	
Pryde	Cook	15°10′S 145°01′E	
Ruby	Cook	15°29′S 144°47′E	
Saunders	Cook	15°39′S 144°54′E	
Solander	Cook	15°27′S 145°06′E	
Tayeto	Hope Vale (A)	15°03′S 145°12′E	
Tupia	Cook	15°02′S 145°03′E	
Welbury	Cook	15°06′S 144°39′E	
Yarico	Cook	15°18′S 144°48′E	
