= Upper Stone, Queensland =

Upper Stone
- Suburb
- Interactive map of Upper Stone
- Coordinates: 18.7963°S 145.9661°E
- Country: Australia
- State: Queensland
- LGA: Shire of Hinchinbrook
- Location: 29.3 km (18.2 mi) WSW of Ingham; 140 km (87 mi) NW of Townsville; 1,490 km (930 mi) NNW of Brisbane

Government
  - State electorate: Hinchinbrook
  - Federal division: Kennedy

Area
  - Total: 324.1 km^{2} (125.1 sq mi)

Population
  - Total: 111 (2021 census)
  - Density: 0.3425/km^{2} (0.887/sq mi)
- Time zone: UTC+10:00 (AEST)
- Postcode: 4850
Suburbs around Upper Stone
Wallaman	Peacock Siding; Lannercost	Wharps
Mount Fox	Upper Stone	Helens Hill
Paluma	Paluma	Yuruga

Upper Stone is a rural locality in the Shire of Hinchinbrook, Queensland, Australia. In the 2021 census, Upper Stone had a population of 111 people.

== Geography ==
The north-western and western edge of the locality are within Girringun National Park which extends into neighbouring Lannercost, Wallaman and Mount Fox.

Stoneleigh is a neighbourhood in the north of the locality (18.7483°S 145.9511°E).

== History ==
Stone State School opened on 4 February 1909 under head teacher Lionel Thomas Braun. The school closed for a short time in 1963. It closed permanently on 17 December 1993. The school was at 1887 Stone River Road (18.7251°S 145.9623°E).

== Demographics ==
In the 2016 census, Upper Stone had a population of 87 people, 45% female and 54% male. The median age of the population was 49 years, 11 years above the national median of 38.

In the 2021 census, Upper Stone had a population of 111 people, 42.7% female and 57.3% male. The median age of the population was 51 years, 13 years above the national median of 38. 87.4% of people living in Upper Stone were born in Australia. The other top response for country of birth was New Zealand at 2.7%. 91.9% of people spoke only English at home; there were no other responses for language spoken at home.

== Education ==
There are no schools in Upper Stone. The nearest government primary schools are:

- Trebonne State School in Trebonne to the north-east
- Toobanna State School in Toobanna to the east
- Mount Fox State School in neighbouring Mount Fox to the west

The nearest government secondary school is Ingham State High School in Ingham to the north-east. However, the southern part of the locality may be too distant for a daily commute; the alternatives are distance education and boarding school.

== Community groups ==
The Upper Stone branch of the Queensland Country Women's Association meets at 19 Stoneleigh Road.
