= Yuruga, Queensland =

Yuruga
- Suburb
- Interactive map of Yuruga
- Coordinates: 18.8584°S 146.1194°E
- Country: Australia
- State: Queensland
- LGA: Shire of Hinchinbrook
- Location: 23.0 km (14.3 mi) S of Ingham; 90.3 km (56.1 mi) NW of Townsville; 258 km (160 mi) S of Cairns; 1,440 km (890 mi) NNW of Brisbane

Government
  - State electorate: Hinchinbrook
  - Federal division: Kennedy

Area
  - Total: 108.7 km^{2} (42.0 sq mi)

Population
  - Total: 64 (2021 census)
  - Density: 0.589/km^{2} (1.525/sq mi)
- Time zone: UTC+10:00 (AEST)
- Postcode: 4850
Suburbs around Yuruga
Helens Hill	Helens Hill	Orient
Upper Stone	Yuruga	Bambaroo
Paluma	Paluma	Bambaroo

Yuruga is a rural locality in the Shire of Hinchinbrook, Queensland, Australia. In the 2021 census, Yuruga had a population of 64 people.

== Geography ==
The Bruce Highway enters the locality from the south-east (Bambaroo) and exits to the north (Helens Hill).

The North Coast railway line also enters the locality from the south-east (Bambaroo) and exits to the north (Helens Hill); it runs east of the highway. The locality was served by the now-abandoned Yuruga railway station (18.8373°S 146.1761°E).

The south of the locality is within the Paluma Range National Park. In the north of the locality, the land use is predominantly crop growing (mostly sugarcane) with some grazing on native vegetation. There are cane tramways to transport the harvested sugarcane to the local sugar mills.

== History ==
In 1870, British colonist John Allingham took up land in the region and named the property Waterview. He experienced much conflict and resistance from the local Aboriginal people and in 1871 a large Native Police barracks was established at Waterview. In 1873, the barracks was moved to Gedge's Crossing on the Herbert River.

In 1925, the name of the locality was changed from Waterview to Yuruga.

Waterview State School opened on 8 May 1919. In 1930, it was renamed Yuruga State School. It closed on 16 December 1994. It was at 20 Yuruga School Road (18.8353°S 146.1552°E).

== Demographics ==
In the 2016 census, Yuruga had a population of 73 people.

In the 2021 census, Yuruga had a population of 64 people.

== Education ==
There are no schools in Yuruga. The nearest government primary schools are Toobanna State School in Toobanna to the north and Mutarnee State School in Mutarnee to the south-east. The nearest government secondary school is Ingham State High School in Ingham to the north. There are also a number of non-government schools in Ingham.
