= Wharps, Queensland =

Wharps
- Suburb
- Interactive map of Wharps
- Coordinates: 18.7295°S 146.0663°E
- Country: Australia
- State: Queensland
- LGA: Shire of Hinchinbrook
- Location: 12.9 km (8.0 mi) SSW of Ingham; 104 km (65 mi) NW of Townsville; 248 km (154 mi) S of Cairns; 1,460 km (910 mi) NNW of Brisbane

Government
  - State electorate: Hinchinbrook
  - Federal division: Kennedy

Area
  - Total: 110.2 km^{2} (42.5 sq mi)

Population
  - Total: 0 (2021 census)
  - Density: 0.000/km^{2} (0.000/sq mi)
- Time zone: UTC+10:00 (AEST)
- Postcode: 4850
Suburbs around Wharps
| Peacock Siding | Trebonne | Trebonne |
| Upper Stone | Wharps | Toobanna |
| Upper Stone | Helens Hill | Helens Hill |

Wharps is a rural locality in the Shire of Hinchinbrook, Queensland, Australia. In the 2021 census, Wharps had "no people or a very low population".

== Geography ==
Mount Poverty is on the south-eastern boundary of the locality with Helens Hill (18.7647°S 146.0890°E), rising 243 metres (797 ft) above sea level.

The locality is within the Wharps rural property, which extends into neighbouring Helens Hill. The land use is predominantly natural resource management, which are natural areas from which resources can be taken, but only in a sustainable manner. There are also small areas of grazing on native vegetation and crop growing.

== Demographics ==
In the 2016 census, Wharps had "no people or a very low population".

In the 2021 census, Wharps had "no people or a very low population".

== Education ==
There are no schools in Wharps. The nearest government primary schools are Trebonne State School in neighbouring Trebonne to the north and Toobanna State School in neighbouring Toobanna to the east. The nearest government secondary school is Ingham State High School in Ingham to the north-east. There are also non-government primary and secondary schools in Ingham.
