= Wairuna, Queensland =

Wairuna
- Suburb
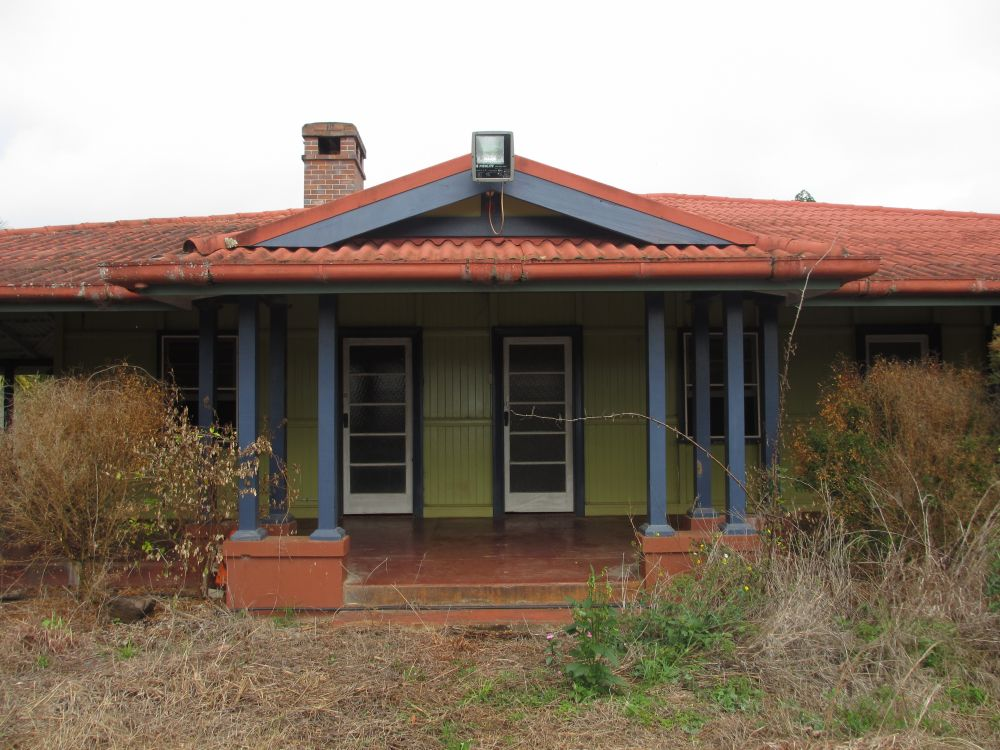
- Wairuna Homestead, 2013

- Interactive map of Wairuna
- Coordinates: 18.3897°S 145.5136°E
- Country: Australia
- State: Queensland
- LGA: Tablelands Region
- Location: 113 km (70 mi) SSE of Mount Garnet; 175 km (109 mi) WNW of Ingham; 209 km (130 mi) SSW of Atherton; 274 km (170 mi) SSW of Cairns; 1,577 km (980 mi) NNW of Brisbane

Government
  - State electorate: Dalrymple
  - Federal division: Kennedy

Area
  - Total: 1,337.6 km^{2} (516.5 sq mi)

Population
  - Total: 0 (2021 census)
  - Density: 0.0000/km^{2} (0.0000/sq mi)
- Time zone: UTC+10:00 (AEST)
- Postcode: 4872
Suburbs around Wairuna
Minnamoolka	Kirrama	Lumholtz
Minnamoolka	Wairuna	Abergowrie
Valley of Lagoons	Valley of Lagoons	Garrawalt

Wairuna is a rural locality in the Tablelands Region, Queensland, Australia. In the 2021 census, Wairuna had "no people or a very low population".

== Geography ==
The entire locality is a protected area. Most of it is within the Girringun National Park, except for the western corner of the locality which is in the Girringun Conservation Park and two small areas in the west and north-west of the locality which are in the Girringun Resources Reserve.

The land use is nature conservation.

== Demographics ==
In the 2016 census, Wairuna had "no people or a very low population".

In the 2021 census, Wairuna had "no people or a very low population".

== Heritage listings ==
Wairuna has a number of heritage-listed sites, including:

- Wairuna Homestead, Wairuna Road (18.4469°S 145.3104°E)
