= Wallaman, Queensland =

Wallaman
- Suburb
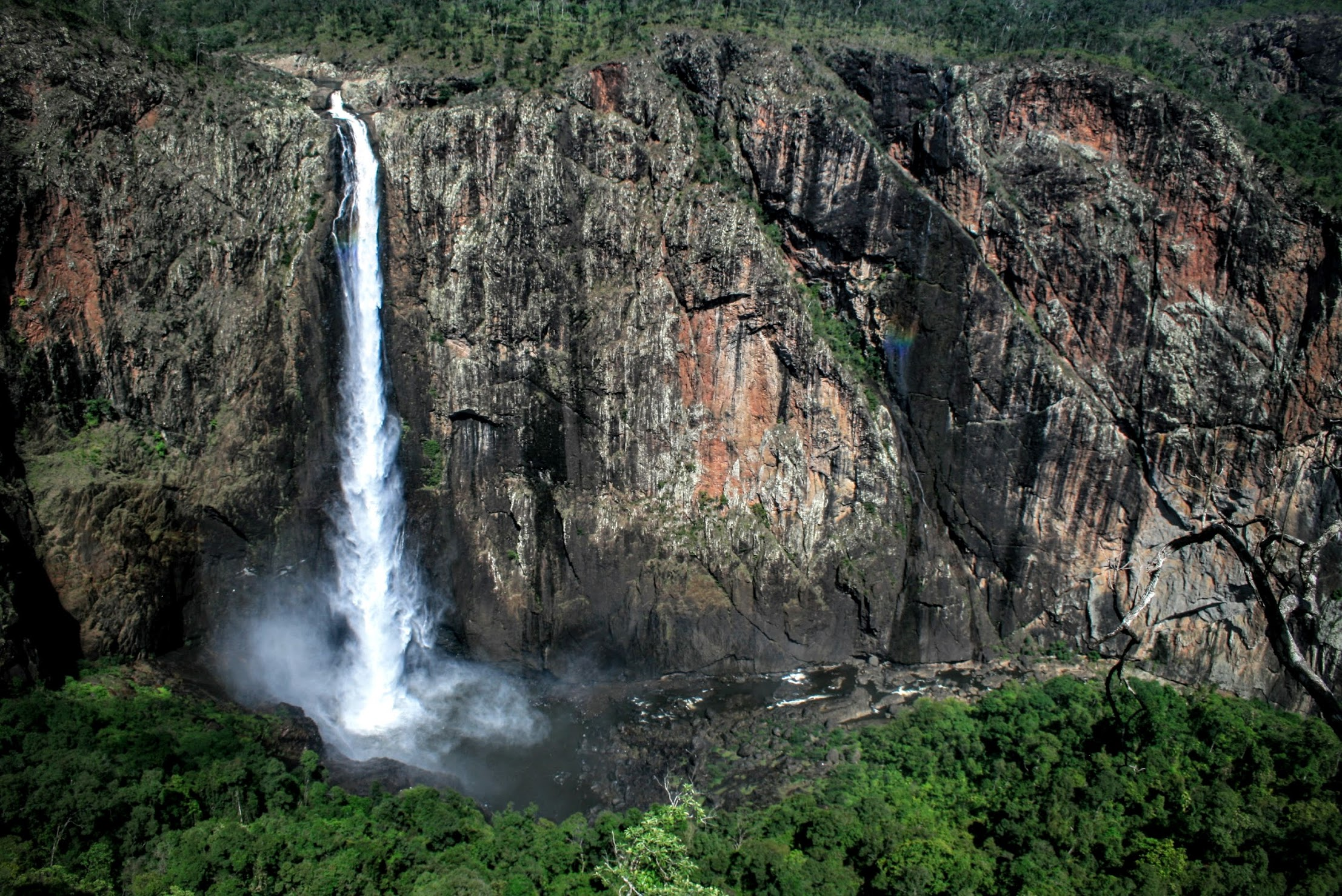
- Wallaman Falls, 2016

- Interactive map of Wallaman
- Coordinates: 18.6676°S 145.8513°E
- Country: Australia
- State: Queensland
- LGA: Shire of Hinchinbrook
- Location: 50.1 km (31.1 mi) WNW of Ingham; 161 km (100 mi) NW of Townsville; 1,509 km (938 mi) NNW of Brisbane

Government
  - State electorate: Hinchinbrook
  - Federal division: Kennedy

Area
  - Total: 133.9 km^{2} (51.7 sq mi)

Population
  - Total: 0 (2021 census)
  - Density: 0.000/km^{2} (0.000/sq mi)
- Time zone: UTC+10:00 (AEST)
- Postcode: 4850
Suburbs around Wallaman
Valley Of Lagoons	Garrawalt	Lannercost
Valley Of Lagoons	Wallaman	Lannercost
Valley Of Lagoons	Mount Fox	Upper Stone

Wallaman is a rural locality in the Shire of Hinchinbrook, Queensland, Australia. In the 2021 census, Wallaman had "no people or a very low population".

== Geography ==
The locality is totally within the Girringun National Park. Wallaman Falls (18.5922°S 145.8014°E) is within both the national park and the locality. The waterfall has a main drop of 268 metres (879 ft), which makes it the country's tallest single-drop waterfall.

Mount Lee is in the south-west of the locality (18.7105°S 145.8760°E), rising to 828 metres (2,717 ft) above sea level.

== Demographics ==
In the 2016 census, Wallaman had "no people or a very low population".

In the 2021 census, Wallaman had "no people or a very low population".

== Education ==
There are no schools in Wallaman. The nearest government primary school is Trebonne State School in Trebonne to the east. The nearest government secondary schools is Ingham State High School in Ingham to the east. There are also non-government schools in Ingham.
