= Mount Fox, Queensland =

Mount Fox
- Suburb
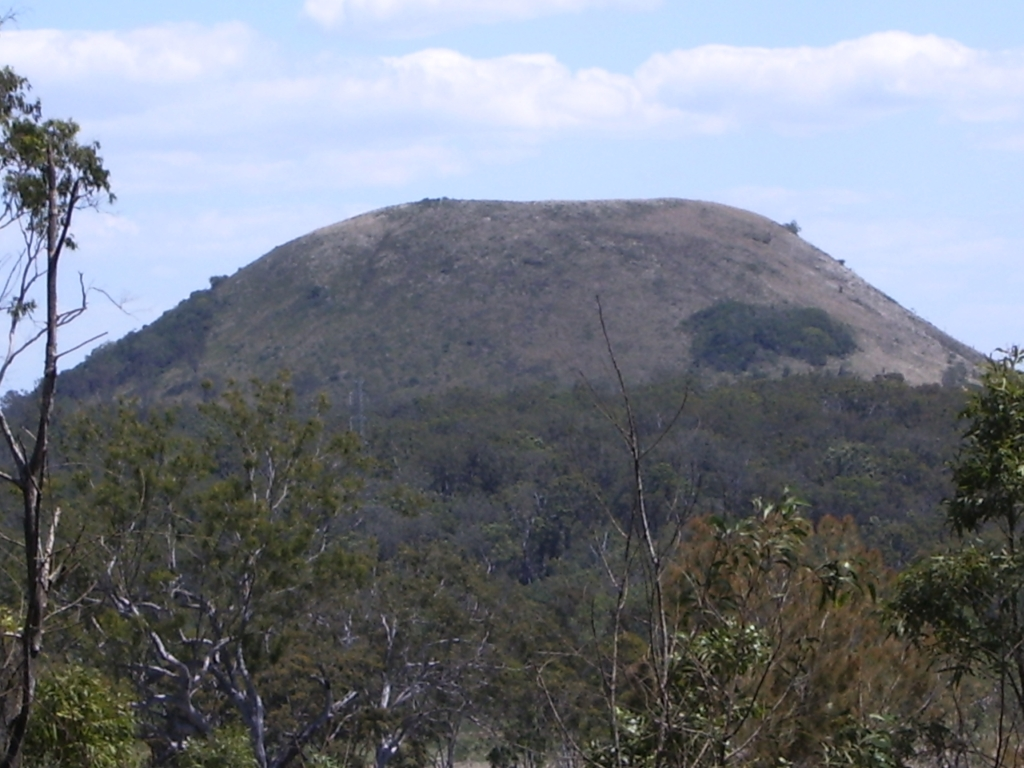
- Mount Fox, 2006

- Interactive map of Mount Fox
- Coordinates: 18.8198°S 145.8544°E
- Country: Australia
- State: Queensland
- LGA: Shire of Hinchinbrook
- Location: 69.5 km (43.2 mi) SW of Ingham; 180 km (110 mi) NW of Townsville; 1,515 km (941 mi) NNW of Brisbane

Government
  - State electorate: Hinchinbrook
  - Federal division: Kennedy

Area
  - Total: 138.7 km^{2} (53.6 sq mi)

Population
  - Total: 84 (2021 census)
  - Density: 0.606/km^{2} (1.569/sq mi)
- Time zone: UTC+10:00 (AEST)
- Postcode: 4850
Suburbs around Mount Fox
Wallaman	Upper Stone	Upper Stone
Valley Of Lagoons	Mount Fox	Upper Stone
Valley Of Lagoons	Paluma	Paluma

Mount Fox is a rural locality in the Shire of Hinchinbrook, Queensland, Australia. In the 2021 census, Mount Fox had a population of 84 people.

== Geography ==
Mount Fox is a locality on the western side of the Great Dividing Range. The eastern side of the locality is mountainous and undeveloped; much of it is within the Girrigun National Park and the Lannercost State Forest. The dormant volcano Mount Fox (also known as Mount Yellerai) is 810 metres (2,660 ft) above sea level in the western part of the locality (18.8411°S 145.8053°E). The locality presumably takes its name from that mountain.

== History ==
Mount Fox State School opened on 12 February 1938 but it closed in December 1941. It reopened on 28 July 1954 but closed on 2 September 1955. It reopened on 11 May 1959 but closed again on 6 July 1964. It reopened on 28 January 1988.

== Demographics ==
In the 2016 census, Mount Fox had a population of 87 people.

In the 2021 census, Mount Fox had a population of 84 people.

== Education ==
Mount Fox State School is a government primary (Early Childhood-6) school for boys and girls at 2957 Mt Fox Road (18.8190°S 145.7945°E). In 2016, the school had an enrolment of 5 students with 2 teachers (1 full-time equivalent) and 4 non-teaching staff (1 full-time equivalent). In 2018, the school had an enrolment of 5 students with 2 teachers (1 full-time equivalent) and 5 non-teaching staff (2 full-time equivalent).

There are no secondary schools in Mount Fox. The nearest government secondary school is Ingham State High School in Ingham to the north-east.
