= Peacock Siding, Queensland =

Peacock Siding
- Suburb
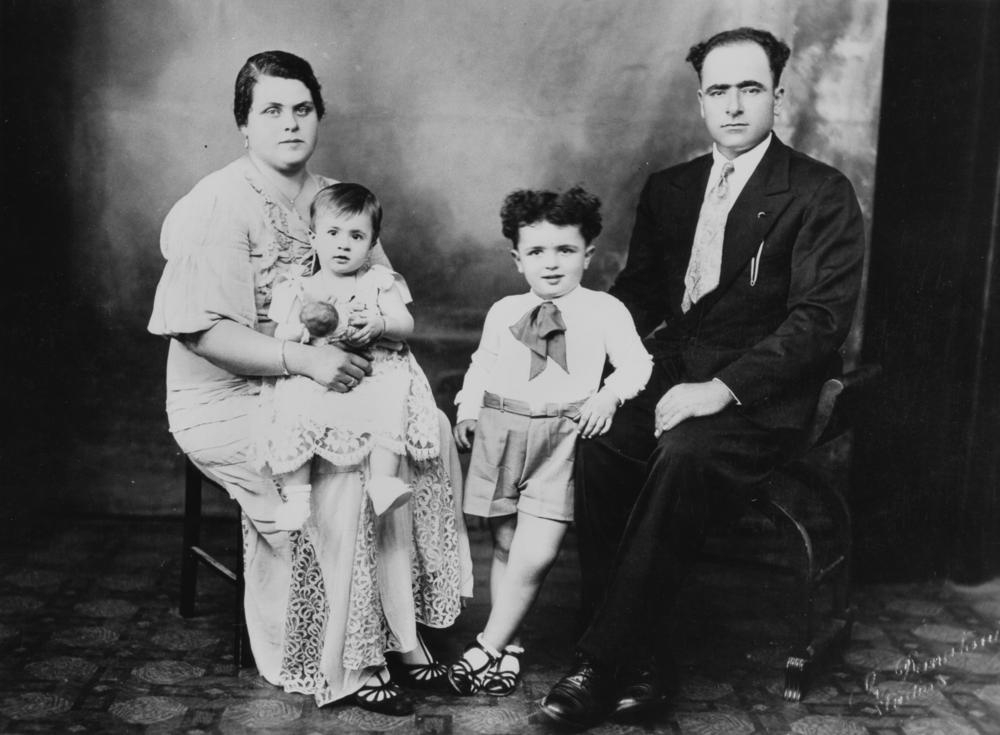
- The Caristi family, Italian immigrant cane farmers at Peacock Siding, 1939

- Interactive map of Peacock Siding
- Coordinates: 18.6920°S 146.0061°E
- Country: Australia
- State: Queensland
- LGA: Shire of Hinchinbrook
- Location: 22.1 km (13.7 mi) WSW of Ingham; 133 km (83 mi) NW of Townsville; 258 km (160 mi) S of Cairns; 1,482 km (921 mi) NNW of Brisbane

Government
  - State electorate: Hinchinbrook
  - Federal division: Kennedy

Area
  - Total: 38.0 km^{2} (14.7 sq mi)

Population
  - Total: 85 (2021 census)
  - Density: 2.237/km^{2} (5.79/sq mi)
- Time zone: UTC+10:00 (AEST)
- Postcode: 4850
Suburbs around Peacock Siding
Lannercost	Lannercost	Trebonne
Upper Stone	Peacock Siding	Wharps
Upper Stone	Upper Stone	Wharps

Peacock Siding is a rural locality in the Shire of Hinchinbrook, Queensland, Australia. In the 2021 census, Peacock Siding had a population of 85 people.

== History ==
Stonevale State School opened on 4 February 1929 under teacher Miss Gay. Circa 1937, it was renamed Peacock Siding State School. It closed in 1949. It was on the eastern side of Stone River Road (approx 18.67945°S 145.99947°E).

== Demographics ==
In the 2016 census, Peacock Siding had a population of 94 people.

In the 2021 census, Peacock Siding had a population of 85 people.

== Education ==
There are no schools in Peacock Siding. The nearest government primary school is Trebonne State School in neighbouring Trebonne to the north-east. The nearest government secondary school is Ingham State High School in Ingham to the north-east.

== Facilities ==
The Grange burial ground is a cemetery off Stone River Road (18.7063°S 145.9642°E).
