= Valley of Lagoons =

Valley Of Lagoons
- Suburb
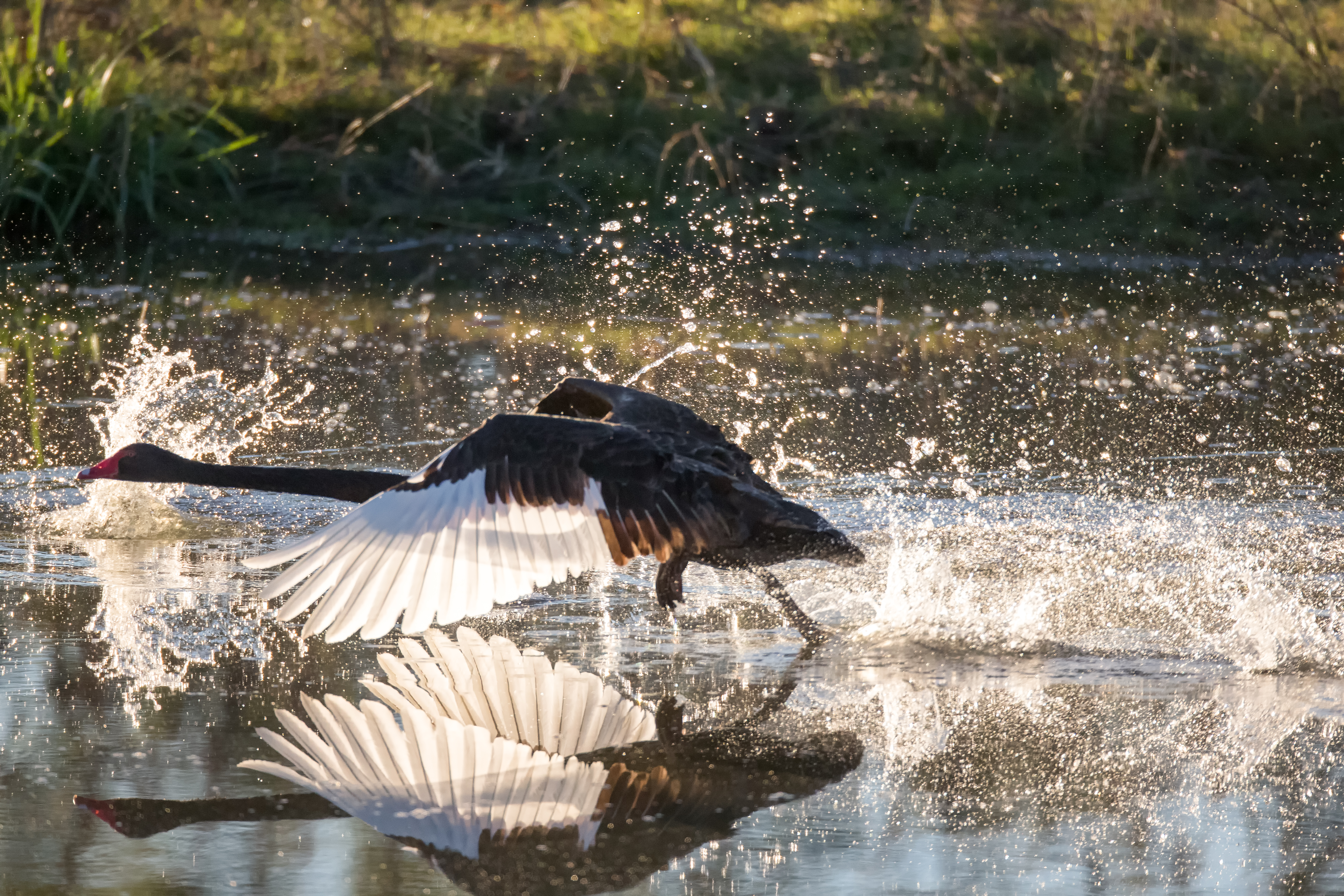
- Black swan, Valley of Lagoons, 2014

- Interactive map of Valley Of Lagoons
- Coordinates: 18.7588°S 145.4130°E
- Country: Australia
- State: Queensland
- LGA: Charters Towers Region
- Location: 55.5 km (34.5 mi) W of Mount Fox; 116 km (72 mi) NE of Greenvale; 205 km (127 mi) NNW of Charters Towers; 248 km (154 mi) NW of Townsville; 1,513 km (940 mi) NNW of Brisbane

Government
  - State electorate: Traeger
  - Federal division: Kennedy

Area
  - Total: 4,500.2 km^{2} (1,737.5 sq mi)

Population
  - Total: 39 (2021 census)
  - Density: 0.00867/km^{2} (0.02245/sq mi)
- Time zone: UTC+10:00 (AEST)
- Postcode: 4850
Suburbs around Valley Of Lagoons
Minnamoolka	Wairuna	Garrawalt
Greenvale	Valley Of Lagoons	Wallaman; Mount Fox
Greenvale	Basalt	Paluma

Valley Of Lagoons is a rural locality in the Charters Towers Region, Queensland, Australia. In the 2021 census, Valley Of Lagoons had a population of 39 people.

== Geography ==
The north-eastern slopes of Boulder Mountain are the origin of the Burdekin River. Downstream the river forms part of the eastern and southern boundary in four separate sections. Douglas Creek, a tributary of the Burdekin, also rises in the area.

There is a 36.4-square-kilometre (14 sq mi) area of wetlands is on a basaltic plateau covered by an inland flood plain that hosts several large off-channel lakes that provide a permanent aquatic habitat. The area is DIWA listed and is a valuable habitat for fish and waterbirds. The area contains a major basalt feature - the 7000 year old Kinrara lava flow - with many springs emanating from a number of locations which in turn drives permanent water flow through the area, the condition of the wetland is good.

Valley Of Lagoons has the following mountains (from north to south):

- Boulder Mountain (18.7045°S 145.7359°E), risiing to 787 metres (2,582 ft) above sea level
- Noname Hill (18.7066°S 145.3526°E) 656 metres (2,152 ft)
- Basalt Hill (18.7620°S 145.5630°E) 592 metres (1,942 ft)
- Black Mountain (18.7798°S 145.6523°E) 538 metres (1,765 ft)
- Mount Claro (18.8609°S 145.7384°E)
- Mount Jimmy (18.8696°S 145.6028°E) 579 metres (1,900 ft)
- Mount Grey (18.9172°S 145.7847°E) 559 metres (1,834 ft)
- Mount Dora (18.9268°S 145.6128°E) 545 metres (1,788 ft)
- The Bluff (18.9822°S 145.7335°E) 467 metres (1,532 ft)
- Mount Lyall (19.0091°S 145.4554°E) 510 metres (1,670 ft)
- Mount Dudley (19.0244°S 145.5023°E)

Part of Girringun National Park is in the north of the locality, extending into neighbouring Wairuna, Garrawalt, and Wallaman.

The land use is grazing on native vegetation.

== History ==
Gugu Badhun is an Australian Aboriginal language of North Queensland. The language region includes areas within the local government area of Charters Towers Region, particularly the localities of Greenvale and the Valley of Lagoons, and in the Upper Burdekin River area and in Abergowrie.

Ludwig Leichhardt and his team were the first Europeans to explore the area on 4 May 1845 on his expedition from Moreton Bay to Port Essington. Leichhardt was very impressed with the area saying:

"About five miles north-west by west from our camp, we discovered an en extensive valley with large lagoons and lakes, and a most luxuriant vegetation, bounded by blue distant ranges, and forming the most picturesque landscape we had yet met with. A chain of lagoons connected by a reedy brook followed the outlines of the table land, along the foot of its steep slopes. ... Water, grass, hills, mountains, plains, forest land; all the elements of a fine pasturing country, were here united."

Leichhardt uses the term "valley of lagoons" several times in his book, presumably the origin of the name.

Based on Leichhardt's favourable reports, George Elphinstone Dalrymple explored the area in 1859. Dalrymple was part of the company that established the Valley of Lagoons Station in 1862 after the area was opened up by the government. A partnership formed between Walter Jervoise Scott, his brother Arthur, Dalrymple and Robert Herbert (then Premier of Queensland) financed the acquisition of the leasehold. The partnership became Scott Bros, Dalrymple & Company with Dalrymple acting as manager.

== Demographics ==
In the 2016 census, Valley Of Lagoons had a population of 48 people.

In the 2021 census, Valley Of Lagoons had a population of 39 people.

== Education ==
There are no schools in Valley Of Lagoons. The nearest government primary schools are Mount Fox State School in neighbouring Mount Fox to the east and Greenvale State School in neighbouring Greenvale to the south-west, but some students may be too distant to attend these schools. There are no secondary schools nearby either; the alternatives are distance education and boarding school.
