= County of Solander =

Solander Queensland
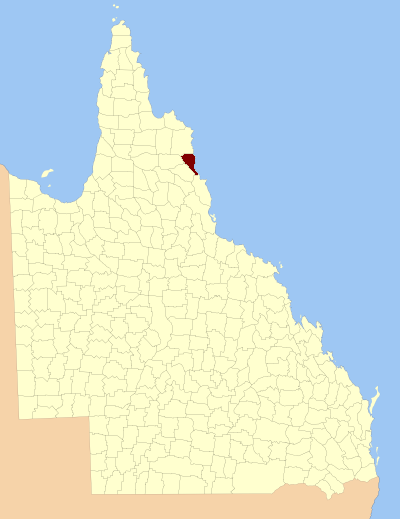
- Location within Queensland
Lands administrative divisions around Solander:
Banks	Pacific Ocean	Pacific Ocean
Dagmar	Solander	Pacific Ocean
Dagmar	Dagmar	Nares

The county of Solander is a cadastral division of Queensland which contains the towns of Ayton, Daintree, Mossman and Port Douglas. The county is divided into civil parishes.

It was originally the southern part of the county of Banks when the counties were named and bounded in 1901.

== Parishes ==
Solander is subdivided into parishes, listed as follows:

Parish	LGA	Coordinates	Towns
Alexandra	Douglas	16°12′S 145°29′E	Alexandra Bay
Amy	Douglas	16°4′S 144°57′E	
Bloomfield	Douglas	16°4′S 145°9′E	
Clerk	Cook	15°54′S 145°17′E	Ayton
Dagmar	Douglas	16°13′S 145°12′E	
Dedin	Douglas	16°22′S 145°16′E	
Kingsdale	Cook	15°47′S 144°57′E	
Mowbray	Douglas	16°36′S 145°27′E	
Noah	Douglas	16°6′S 145°21′E	Cape Tribulation
Phipps	Cook	15°50′S 145°7′E	
Salisbury	Douglas	16°32′S 145°26′E	Port Douglas
Sporing	Cook	15°55′S 145°6′E	
Spurgeon	Douglas	16°13′S 145°4′E	
Tribulation	Douglas	16°00′S 145°22′E	
Victory	Douglas	16°30′S 145°21′E	Mossman
Whyanbeel	Douglas	16°22′S 145°22′E	Daintree
