= Lannercost, Queensland =

Lannercost
- Suburb
- Interactive map of Lannercost
- Coordinates: 18.6131°S 145.9722°E
- Country: Australia
- State: Queensland
- LGA: Shire of Hinchinbrook
- Location: 9.0 km (5.6 mi) WNW of Trebonne; 18.5 km (11.5 mi) NW of Ingham; 129 km (80 mi) NW of Townsville; 1,464 km (910 mi) NNW of Brisbane

Government
  - State electorate: Hinchinbrook
  - Federal division: Kennedy

Area
  - Total: 239.2 km^{2} (92.4 sq mi)

Population
  - Total: 168 (2021 census)
  - Density: 0.7023/km^{2} (1.819/sq mi)
- Time zone: UTC+10:00 (AEST)
- Postcode: 4850
Suburbs around Lannercost
Garrawalt	Long Pocket	Dalrymple Creek
Wallaman	Lannercost	Hawkins Creek
Upper Stone	Peacock Siding	Trebonne

Lannercost is a rural locality in the Shire of Hinchinbrook, Queensland, Australia. In the 2021 census, Lannercost had a population of 168 people.

== History ==
Long Pocket State School opened on 26 July 1915 and closed on 14 February 1994. It was at 2062 Abergowrie Road (18.5419°S 146.0194°E), now in Lannercost.

Lannercost State School opened on 24 October 1929 and closed on 10 September 1962. It was on Lannercost Extension Road near the junction with Venables Crossing Road (18.6410°S 146.0299°E).

== Demographics ==
In the 2016 census, Lannercost had a population of 121 people, 47.6% female and 52.4% male. The median age of the population was 47 years, 9 years above the national median of 38. 90.4% of people living in Lannercost were born in Australia. The other top response for country of birth was Italy at 3.5%. 85% of people spoke only English at home; the next most common language was Italian at 8.7%.

In the 2021 census, Lannercost had a population of 168 people, 46.3% female and 53.7% male. The median age of the population was 45 years, 7 years above the national median of 38. 82.1% of people living in Lannercost were born in Australia. The other top responses for country of birth were Italy 2.4% and New Zealand 1.8%. 82.7% of people spoke only English at home; the next most common language was Italian at 7.1%.

== Education ==
There are no schools in Lannercost. The nearest government primary school is Trebonne State School in neighbouring Trebonne to the south-east. The nearest government secondary school is Ingham State High School in Ingham to the south-east.
