= Bambaroo, Queensland =

Bambaroo
- Suburb
- Interactive map of Bambaroo
- Coordinates: 18.8875°S 146.1855°E
- Country: Australia
- State: Queensland
- LGA: Shire of Hinchinbrook
- Location: 27.5 km (17.1 mi) S of Ingham; 83.9 km (52.1 mi) NW of Townsville; 1,415 km (879 mi) NNW of Brisbane

Government
  - State electorate: Hinchinbrook
  - Federal division: Kennedy

Area
  - Total: 90.9 km^{2} (35.1 sq mi)

Population
  - Total: 146 (2021 census)
  - Density: 1.606/km^{2} (4.160/sq mi)
- Time zone: UTC+10:00 (AEST)
- Postcode: 4850
Suburbs around Bambaroo
Yuruga	Yuruga	Orient
Yuruga	Bambaroo	Coolbie
Paluma	Paluma	Crystal Creek

Bambaroo is a rural locality in the Shire of Hinchinbrook, Queensland, Australia. In the 2021 census, Bambaroo had a population of 146 people.

== Geography ==
Bambaroo has two distinct parts geographically.

The centre and north-east is low-lying flat land (approx 20 metres above sea level), drained by numerous small creeks which flow into the Coral Sea in neighbouring Orient and Coolbie. This freehold land is predominantly used to grow sugarcane. A cane tramway delivers harvested sugarcane to the local sugar mills at Victoria Plantation and Macknade.

Abswold is a neighbourhood within the north-east of the locality (18.8666°S 146.2166°E).

The Bruce Highway and the North Coast railway line both enter the locality from the east (Coolbie) and exit to the north (Yuruga) travelling through this flat part of the locality. Historically, three railway stations serviced the locality (from north to south):

- Scrubview railway station, now abandoned (18.8442°S 146.1802°E)
- Bambaroo railway station, servicing the town (18.8602°S 146.1940°E)
- Abswold railway station, now abandoned (18.8683°S 146.2115°E)

The south-western part of the locality is mountainous and undeveloped, rising up to 980 metres above sea level. This land is protected as Paluma Range National Park.

== History ==
Bambaroo State School opened on 3 November 1924, although it was not officially opened until 19 May 1925 by Thomas Wilson, the Minister of Public Instruction. It closed on 31 December 2016. It was at 10 Bambaroo School Road (18.8679°S 146.1889°E). The school's website has been archived.

== Demographics ==
In the 2016 census, Bambaroo had a population of 126 people.

In the 2021 census, Bambaroo had a population of 146 people.

== Education ==
There are no schools in Bambaroo. The nearest government primary schools are Mutarnee State School in Mutarnee to the south-east and Toobanna State School in Toobanna to the north. The nearest government secondary school is Ingham State High School in Ingham to the north.

== In popular culture ==
Bambaroo is one of the Australian place names mentioned in the second verse of the song "I've Been Everywhere" written by Australian country singer Geoff Mack in 1959, and made popular by Lucky Starr in 1962.
