= County of Nares =

Nares Queensland
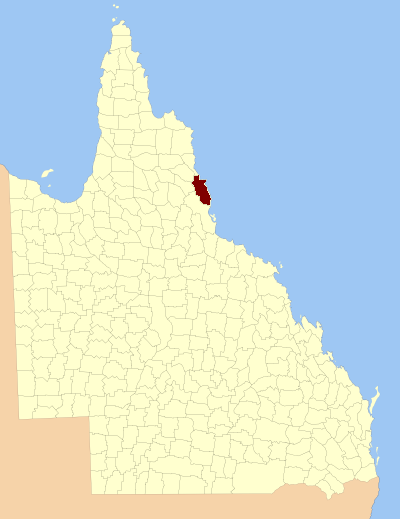
- Location within Queensland
Lands administrative divisions around Nares:
Chelmsford	Solander	Pacific Ocean
Dagmar	Nares	Pacific Ocean
Hodgkinson	Cardwell	Pacific Ocean

The county of Nares is a cadastral division of Queensland which contains the city of Cairns, Innisfail and most of the Atherton Tableland. The county is divided into civil parishes. It was named after George Nares (1831–1915), a naval officer and commander of HMS Salamander. Cairns is mentioned as being in the county of Nares in the 1911 Britannica. It is bounded by the Daintree River in the north.

== Parishes ==
Nares is subdivided into parishes, listed as follows:

Parish	LGA	Coordinates	Towns
Barron	Tablelands	17°15′S 145°29′E	Atherton, Tolga
Bartle Frere	Tablelands	17°25′S 145°45′E	
Bellenden Ker	Cairns	17°20′S 145°53′E	Babinda, Bellenden Ker, Miriwinni
Cairns	Cairns	16°53′S 145°40′E	Cairns, Kuranda
Danbulla	Tablelands	17°07′S 145°36′E	
Dinden	Mareeba	17°00′S 145°34′E	
Dirran	Tablelands	17°30′S 145°37′E	Tarzali, Millaa Millaa
Dulanban	Cairns	16°40′S 145°33′E	
East Barron	Tablelands	17°19′S 145°33′E	Yungaburra
Formartine	Mareeba	16°52′S 145°29′E	
Gadgarra	Tablelands	17°15′S 145°44′E	
Glady	Cassowary Coast	17°28′S 145°56′E	Flying Fish Point
Grafton	Cairns	17°05′S 145°44′E	Edmonton, Gordonvale
Hull	Cassowary Coast	17°47′S 146°00′E	Silkwood, South Mission Beach, El Arish
Japoon	Cassowary Coast	17°44′S 145°55′E	Japoon
Johnstone	Cassowary Coast	17°36′S 145°55′E	Innisfail, South Johnstone
Jordan	Cassowary Coast	17°39′S 145°45′E	
Malanda	Tablelands	17°22′S 145°37′E	Malanda
Monamona	Mareeba	16°46′S 145°30′E	
Mourilyan	Cassowary Coast	17°37′S 146°03′E	Mourilyan, parts of Innisfail
Palmerston	Cassowary Coast	17°34′S 145°45′E	
Russell	Cairns	17°19′S 145°59′E	Bramston Beach
Smithfield	Tablelands	16°46′S 145°38′E	Northern Beaches
Sophia	Cairns	17°07′S 145°52′E	Aloomba
Tinaroo	Mareeba	17°04′S 145°25′E	Mareeba, Walkamin
Trinity	Cairns	16°58′S 145°49′E	Yarrabah
