= Orient, Queensland =

Orient
- Suburb
- Interactive map of Orient
- Coordinates: 18.7990°S 146.2508°E
- Country: Australia
- State: Queensland
- LGA: Shire of Hinchinbrook
- Location: 20.3 km (12.6 mi) SSE of Ingham; 118 km (73 mi) NW of Townsville; 256 km (159 mi) S of Cairns; 1,560 km (970 mi) NNW of Brisbane

Government
  - State electorate: Hinchinbrook
  - Federal division: Kennedy

Area
  - Total: 100.5 km^{2} (38.8 sq mi)

Population
  - Total: 0 (2021 census)
  - Density: 0.000/km^{2} (0.000/sq mi)
- Time zone: UTC+10:00 (AEST)
- Postcode: 4850
Suburbs around Orient
Toobanna	Blackrock	Forrest Beach
Helens Hill	Orient	Coral Sea
Yuruga	Bambaroo	Coolbie

Orient is a coastal rural locality in the Shire of Hinchinbrook, Queensland, Australia. In the 2021 census, Orient had "no people or a very low population".

== Geography ==
The Coral Sea forms the eastern boundary of the locality which has a sandy beach known as Bronte Beach. Cattle Creek forms the western and southern boundary, while Trebonne Creek and Palm Creek forms parts of the northern boundary.

Most of the east and south of the locality is within the Halifax Bay Wetlands National Park.

Orient Road is the only road route through the locality, entering from the north-west (Blackrock) and proceeding south and then east, becoming Bronte Road which provides access to and through the national park.

Apart from the national park, the land use is a mixture of crop growing (mostly sugarcane) and grazing on native vegetation. There is a cane tramway to transport the harvested sugarcane to the Victoria sugar mill.

== Demographics ==
In the 2016 census, Orient had a population of 3 people.

In the 2021 census, Orient had "no people or a very low population".

== Education ==
There are no schools in Orient. The nearest government primary school is Toobanna State School in neighbouring Toobanna to the north-west. The nearest government secondary school is Ingham State High School in Ingham to the north-west. There are also Catholic primary and secondary schools in Ingham.
