= Mount Fox (Queensland) =

Mountain in Queensland, Australia

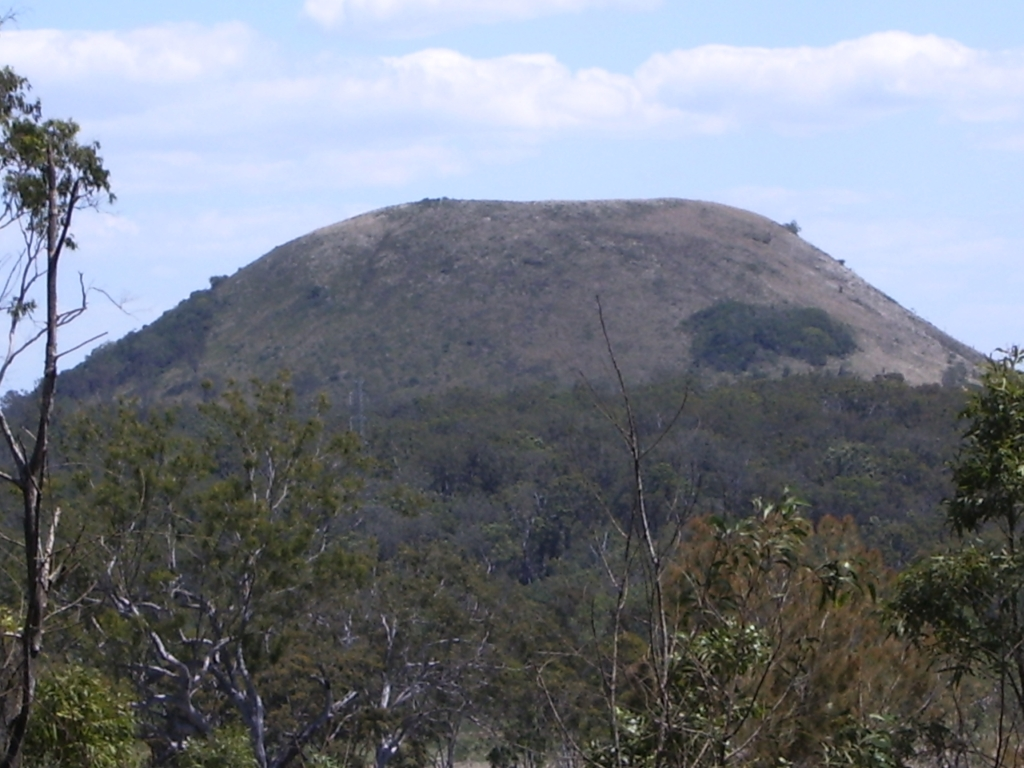
- Mount Fox crater

Highest point
- Elevation: 120 m (390 ft)
- Coordinates: 18°50′30.65″S 145°48′17.45″E

Geography
- Location within Queensland
- Location: Queensland, Australia

Geology
- Rock age: 560,000 years
- Mountain type: dormant volcano

Mount Fox is a dormant volcano located in the locality of Mount Fox, 50 km west of Ingham, Shire of Hinchinbrook, Queensland, Australia. Mount Fox has a shallow crater and a lava flow that extends away from the southern base of the cone. The cone lies on basaltic lava flows that are 23.6 million years old. Mount Fox is famous for its volcanic crater, which was formed 100,000 years ago by a volcanic eruption.

== See also ==
- List of volcanoes in Australia
