= Garrawalt, Queensland =

Rural locality in Queensland, Australia

Garrawalt
- Suburb
- Interactive map of Garrawalt
- Coordinates: 18.5176°S 145.8377°E
- Country: Australia
- State: Queensland
- LGA: Shire of Hinchinbrook
- Location: 45.4 km (28.2 mi) NW of Ingham; 156 km (97 mi) NW of Townsville; 280 km (170 mi) S of Cairns; 1,512 km (940 mi) NNW of Brisbane

Government
  - State electorate: Hinchinbrook
  - Federal division: Kennedy

Area
  - Total: 184.1 km^{2} (71.1 sq mi)

Population
  - Total: 0 (2021 census)
  - Density: 0.0000/km^{2} (0.000/sq mi)
- Time zone: UTC+10:00 (AEST)
- Postcode: 4850
Suburbs around Garrawalt
Wairuna	Abergowrie	Abergowrie
Valley Of Lagoons	Garrawalt	Long Pocket
Valley Of Lagoons	Wallaman	Lannercost

Garrawalt is a rural locality in the Shire of Hinchinbrook, Queensland, Australia. In the 2021 census, Garrawalt had "no people or a very low population".

== Geography ==
The locality is loosely bounded to the north by the Herbert River, which separates the mountainous terrain of the locality from the flat sugarcane farming areas of Abergowrie to the north.

Garrawalt has the following mountains:

- Mount Facing in the south-east (18.5363°S 145.9142°E), rising to 585 metres (1,919 ft) above sea level
- The Pinnacles in the north of the locality (18.4707°S 145.7826°E), rising to 581 metres (1,906 ft)

Most of the locality is within the Girringun National Park except for some small areas adjacent to the Herbert River which are flatter lower land (30 metres (98 ft) above sea level) using for farming.

== History ==
The locality was named and bounded on 27 April 2001.

== Demographics ==
In the 2016 census, Garrawalt had "no people or a very low population".

In the 2021 census, Garrawalt had "no people or a very low population".

== Education ==
There are no schools in Girrawalt. The nearest government primary school is Abergowrie State School in neighbouring Abergowrie to the north. The nearest government secondary school is Ingham State High School in Ingham to the south-east.
