= Wairuna Homestead =

Building in Australia

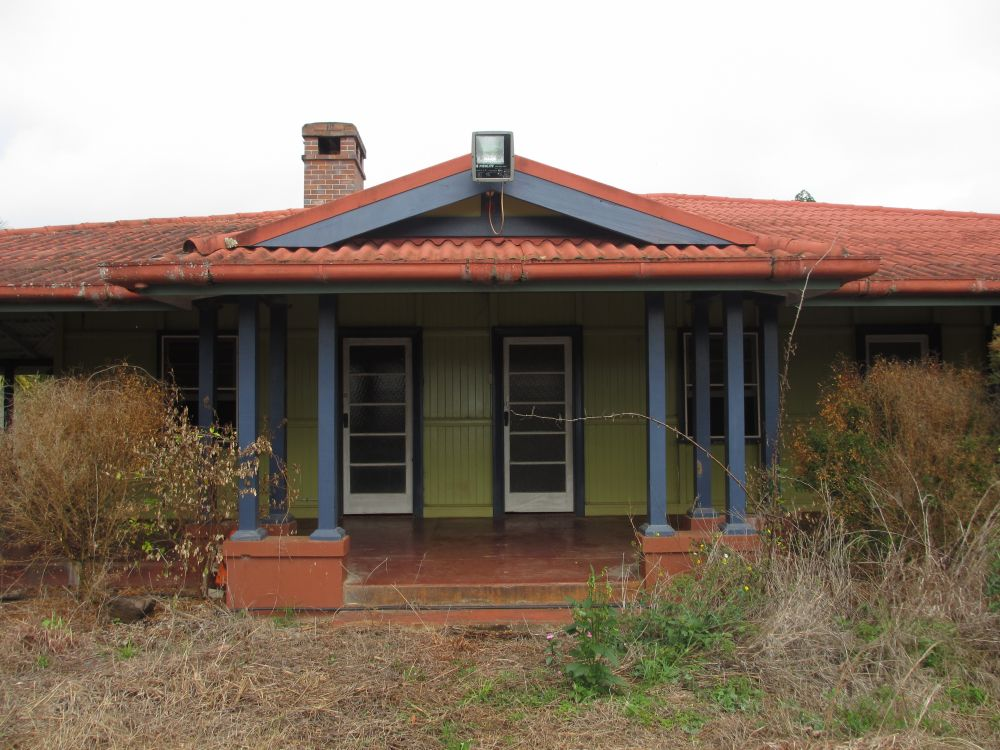
- Wairuna Homestead, 2013

- Location within Queensland Location within Australia
- 18.4469°S 145.3104°E
- Location: Wairuna Road, Wairuna, Tablelands Region, Queensland, Australia

History
- Design period: 1940s - 1960s (post-World War II)
- Built: 1940s

Site notes
- Architectural style: Modernism

Queensland Heritage Register
- Official name: Wairuna Homestead and Cemetery, Wairuna Station Homestead and Cemetery
- Type: state heritage (built)
- Designated: 9 August 2013
- Reference no.: 602823
- Significant period: 1899-
- Builders: Harold and Norman Johnston

Wairuna Homestead is a heritage-listed homestead at Wairuna Road, Wairuna, Tablelands Region, Queensland, Australia. It was built in 1940s by Harold and Norman Johnston. It is also known as Wairuna Station Homestead and Cemetery. It was added to the Queensland Heritage Register on 9 August 2013.

== History ==
Wairuna Homestead, located approximately 80 kilometres (50 mi) south of Mount Garnet in the watershed of the Burdekin River, comprises a 1940s timber residence, early cottage, head stockman's house, barracks, sheds, butchering hut and a small cemetery established in 1899. From 1881 until 1976 Wairuna station was operated by the Atkinson family, an important north Queensland pastoral family. From the 1930s Wairuna station was a centre for the Council for Scientific and Industrial Research (CSIR) partnered research into the suitability of Brahman-cross cattle in northern Australia and later for the establishment of the Australian Brahman breed. For more than two decades it was the home of Kenneth Edward James Atkinson, a significant initiator of the Australian Brahman breed, who co-established the Australian Brahman Breeders' Association in 1946 and played an important role in the development of Brahman and Brahman-cross cattle in Australia.

The northern part of the Kennedy district in north Queensland, where Wairuna is located, was settled quickly by pastoralists in the early 1860s. By the end of 1861 the best of the country had been selected, including the entire Burdekin River frontage. During this initial rush James Atkinson (1824–1899), in partnership with Ezra Firth, attempted to establish a run on land later claimed to be part of the early station The Valley of Lagoons. Subsequently, c.1863 Atkinson and Firth formed Mt Surprise station to the north. Their partnership lasted for about seven years before Atkinson took up land in the lower Herbert district, where he established the cattle run and cane farm Farnham near the site of Ingham. Atkinson, the son of a linen manufacturer of Scottish descent, was born in County Armagh, Ireland in 1824. After service in the British army he migrated to Victoria in c. 1854, spent time on the Ballarat goldfield and farmed in the Port Fairy district. He married Kate Good in 1859. He, his wife and daughter travelled to north Queensland in the early 1860s to take up pastoral land.

During the 1860s north Queensland's early pastoralists struggled to survive for a number of reasons. Within a decade they found that footrot, fluke, lung worm and spear grass made most of the area unsuitable for sheep. There was no ready market for cattle because population centres were too far away. Until boiling down works opened in Townsville and Burketown in 1866 almost the only means of disposing of surplus cattle locally was to sell them to other squatters stocking new runs. Ports were distant and getting to them difficult, the Aboriginal people were hostile, the climate was challenging and from 1866 Queensland was in financial crisis.

Queensland's monetary situation badly affected squatters in the Burke, Cook and Kennedy districts. They appealed to the government for more secure and extended tenure and for rental relief. Despite new land legislation enacted in 1868 extending leases, reducing rental and giving pastoralists the option of buying one block of 2560 acres per run, four times as many runs were abandoned in 1869 as in the previous year. In the six years from 1866 no new pastoral leases were taken up in the Kennedy district and most passed out of the hands of the original owners. Few of the remainder had prospered, and the failure of sheep and unsatisfactory markets for cattle gave no promise of an early improvement.

However, the 1870s brought some relief to pastoralists as the establishment of northern goldfields created a local market for fresh meat. From 1872 buyers from Ravenswood and Charters Towers goldfields provided strong demand on stations in the vicinity. The Palmer River rush in 1873 sent cattle prices up to an average of £10 a head.

The new demand for beef as a result of the establishment of goldfields, the growth of the sugar industry, the establishment of ports and a run of fair seasons restarted squatting in north Queensland. This second wave of expansion, from 1874, created a demand for stores and breeders not only in north Queensland but in Western Australia and the Northern Territory. While this eased the pastoralists' financial situation in the short run, it exacerbated the problem in the long term as the grossly oversupplied market caused extremely low cattle prices at the end of the 1870s. By 1880 north Queensland cattle numbers were estimated at 450,000 - almost three times the 1874 figure. The Townsville boiling down works re-opened in 1880 to deal with the excess.

Nevertheless, in 1881 James Atkinson sold some of his land in the lower Herbert to the Colonial Sugar Refining Co (CSR), purchased Wairuna station in the upper Burdekin and moved there with his wife, daughter, three sons and cattle herd. The Wairuna lease had been established in 1879 by Henry Stone and Duncan McAuslan while Henry Stone applied for Wairuna No 2 lease a year later.

The siting of the homestead on its flood-free position enabled management of the land from then onwards. Early writers commented on the homestead's siting and the beauty of its setting. It was "very prettily situated on a hill overlooking a grassy margined lake of considerable size, surrounded by high hills, and when you first catch sight of it, you naturally say, 'well, this takes a lot of beating'. And so it does, for beauty of landscape". A second wrote, "This well-known station home...is beautifully situated on a rise overlooking the Herbert, just before that river takes its plunge down the scrub-clad gullies to the level of the coast".

From the 1880s north Queensland cattlemen began to participate in southern markets, especially Melbourne and Adelaide. Although growth slowed during the dry years of 1884–1885 and 1888–1889, in the 5 years from 1889 cattle numbers increased quickly, to reach a peak of 1,390,899 head or 19.8 per cent of all Queensland cattle in 1894.

Up to 1890 the cattle industry in north Queensland struggled for profitability because the supply of cattle greatly exceeded demand, and cattle prices were depressed. This appears to be borne out by the Wairuna lease being held by the Bank of New South Wales as mortgagor for James Atkinson from 26 September 1887, which was still the case in 1900. However, Geoffrey Bolton states that "[g]radually between 1870 and 1890 most of the northern graziers achieved, if not prosperity, a modest standard of comfort". The usual type of homestead residence was represented by Gunnawarra, "a comfortable house with slab walls and floors and a very large stone and antbed fireplace". Similarly, the Wairuna residence in 1900 was a modest slab house with a corrugated iron roof on the site of the current residence.

Three major structural changes in the beef cattle industry took place in the 1890s. The Australian banking crisis of 1893, combined with low cattle prices and restricted markets, caused a change in the pattern of ownership, with many large stations passing to banks and pastoral finance companies. Secondly, a new type of owner was created: grazing selectors, initially given 30 year leases on areas not larger than 20,000 acres (subsequently increased to 60,000 acres). The third major change was the successful establishment of freezing plants in north Queensland, enabling cattle producers to enter the world market. Coinciding with these changes was the severe reduction in stock numbers from c. 1894 due to cattle tick, which killed a third or more of the cattle herd, and from the drought of 1898–1902. Wairuna experienced a 50 per cent loss of stock from the disease in 1896 when it first broke out on the property.

By the time of Aktinson's death and burial in Wairuna Cemetery in 1899 he was semi-retired and in equal shares partnership with his three sons - Henry John, Robert James and Thomas Joseph. His quarter share of the lease passed to his sons. Subsequently, the Atkinson brothers' partnership increased its land and stock.

The partnership continued until 6 May 1914 when the eldest brother, Henry John, withdrew. Wairuna station was initially transferred to him with a number of other properties, but was later sold to his brothers.

From the 1890s until the 1950s, the north Queensland beef cattle industry was hampered by a number of factors. The prevalence of cattle tick meant that dipping was required to control it, although some tick resistance in the cattle did occur. Markets fluctuated: for example, the World War I boom was followed by a collapse of the beef export trade in 1921 resulting in a long and serious depression until 1939. Additionally, during the interwar period, three new diseases in northern stock were recognised - buffalo fly, Pegleg (due to phosphate deficiency) and ephemeral fever. Drought and long dry seasons remained a problem for northern cattlemen. Markets improved again during World War II but it was not until 1953 that the herd numbers surpassed the 1894 level.

In an effort to resolve some of these problems, a few northern beef cattle producers began investigating the suitability of Brahman or Zebu (Bos indicus) cattle and Brahman cross-bred cattle for their tick-resistance and tolerance of hot, dry conditions. As early as 1910 William McDowall of Christmas Creek station purchased two Brahman bulls from Melbourne Zoo. The last of these bulls died in 1921. From their progeny, the best calves were kept for bulls and crosses were bred from them with station cattle. The cross-bred progeny were subsequently sold to various north Queensland stations. Descendants of these early Brahman were used by Henry John Atkinson on his adjacent Greenvale station and by his nephew Ken Atkinson of Wairuna. By 1923 Henry John Atkinson on his Greenvale property was "demonstrating the possibility of improving the existing types of beef cattle in the North by mating Zebu bulls with shorthorn stock, his object being the production of a hardier type, ... practically tick resistant and capable of withstanding the drought conditions to which the popular strains succumb". Ken Atkinson's older brother, Robert La Mont Atkinson (1902–1986), recalled that from 1926 he determined to try and form a new breed with a Brahman base which would be better for north Queensland conditions than the British breeds and more able to cope with ticks and droughts.

Parallel with these initiatives was scientific interest in developing cattle suitable for the tropics. In 1920 veterinarian and former administrator of the Northern Territory, Dr John Anderson Gilruth (1871–1937), toured Texas, USA which strengthened his conviction that "vigorously controlled cattle breeding experiments in north Queensland would be wise". In 1929 a Joint Commission appointed to enquire into the beef cattle industry of northern Australia reported that there should be investigation of "problems of animal genetics with the object of creating a new breed of tropical cattle". Subsequently, when preparing a research program for CSIR in north Queensland, Gilruth (acting chief of the division of animal health within CSIR) included a tropical cattle breeding project which was approved by CSIR council. In 1930 money was made available "for an inquiry into Zebu crossbreeding experiments carried out by the US Bureau of Animal Industry and others in the southern USA".

Dr Ralph Bodkin Kelley (1890–1970) of the CSIR arrived in the USA in January 1931 to gather information about the advantages of Brahman cross-breeding in Texas. On his return to Australia, a CSIR proposal to establish a cattle breeding station for experimental mating of Brahman and British cattle breeds in north Queensland was rejected by a graziers' meeting in Rockhampton. Influential men such as James Lockie Wilson (1880–1956), an executive member of the United Graziers' Association (UGA) for 27 years, opposed CSIR's introduction of Brahman cattle. The project remained dormant until 1933 when Dr Gilruth negotiated an agreement with three pastoral companies and one Central Queensland grazier. They would fund the purchase and importation of USA-sourced Brahman cattle into Australia, provide the British cattle for hybridisation and maintain the cattle and their progeny. Negotiations between Winter-Irving and Alison; Meredith Menzies and Company (Millungera); Queensland Stations Ltd; and grazier, and Colin W Wright, owner of Waverley and Branxholm in the St Lawrence district in Central Queensland, were completed in January 1933.

This syndicate imported 18 Brahman cattle selected by Dr Kelley and shipped in 1933. The cattle, which averaged two years old, were sent to Wright's property, Waverley station, for acclimatisation and inoculation before being divided among the syndicate members for use in the CSIR breeding trials.

As early as 1930 the writer, "Vellus", in The Queenslander, was promoting the attributes of Brahman cattle - tick resistance, heat- resistance, disease resistance and breeding efficiency. However, opposition to Brahman cross-breeding from cattlemen was expressed for many years to come.

At Wairuna, Ken Atkinson, grandson of James, began breeding Brahman cross-bred cattle in 1936 with 15 heifers and two bulls purchased from Greenvale Station. The cattle carried ½ to ¾ Brahman blood and were descendants of the Christmas Creek bulls procured from Melbourne Zoo in 1910. Additionally, Atkinson purchased the pure-bred Nellore (i.e. small eared) Brahman bull "Abel" from Waverley station in 1939 although the sale of progeny by syndicate members was not permitted. When CSIR learned of this purchase it invited Atkinson to join the syndicate and subscribe to its agreement; which he did.

Atkinson and his mother and siblings, inherited the estate of his father Robert James Atkinson of Cashmere and Wairuna after his death in March 1939, however, Atkinson had been managing Wairuna from c. 1930. In 1939 the homestead comprised an early residence, dairy room, car shed, boiler shed, two Aboriginal quarters, blacksmith's shop, fowl house and stockyard. Most of these structures were replaced, many during Ken Atkinson's management of the property. Buildings added to the site during this time were the current residence, garage with school room, two sets of barracks and the head stockman's house. The rock-walled terraced gardens surrounding the northern garden of the residence were established by the 1950s.

The current residence was designed and built in 1940. In March of that year Ken Atkinson "made plans" for the house and in August the building contractor, NW Johnston of Kairi, visited Wairuna and "drew plans" for the house. These included an existing kitchen in the design. Building commenced in October after the demolition of the old house on the site and building contractors Harold and Norman Johnston completed it by 21 December 1940. It cost £2500 to build. The homestead residence was later described as "one of the most attractive in north Queensland". As well as being the family home, it accommodated guests such as purchasers of stud cattle and distinguished visitors, such as Sir George and Lady Johnson.

From the residence office, Ken Atkinson organised his Brahman breeding programme and performed the duties of office-bearer in various organisations of importance to the beef cattle industry over the next two decades. He co-created the Zebu Breeders Society of Australia in 1946 (later the Australian Brahman Breeders' Association i.e. ABBA); was a foundation member of The Australian Tropical Beef Breeders' Association (1952); and helped establish the North Queensland Saleyards Pty Ltd, of which he was the chairman of the board of directors from 1947 to 1976. He also served as chairman of the Mt Garnet branch of the Northern Graziers' Association between 1946 and 1949 and was a committee member of the Graziers' Association of Central and Northern Queensland in 1949. In addition to his Brahman cross and Brahman stud herds, Atkinson also conducted a Poll Hereford Stud from c. 1941 and a Santa Gertrudis stud from 1952. In 1955 he joined the prestigious Queensland Club.

Wairuna station was described in 1943 as about 700 square miles of coastal range country situated on the tableland west of the range that runs parallel to the north-east coast of Australia. It surrounded and followed the headwaters of the Burdekin. The country principally was open forest (savannah woodland), and well-watered by creeks and lagoons. Ticks were present and it was necessary to dip British-bred cattle fairly regularly, depending on the extent of the infestation. Some paddocks were fenced off, but much of the country was "open".

In 1943 the Wairuna Brahman cross-bred (hybrid) herd totalled 170 including the pure-bred bull "Abel" and one pure-bred female; the remainder being various cross-bred cattle. The hybrids, which were relatively few in number, were depastured with the other cattle (mainly Devon Shorthorn crosses), of which there were approximately 7000. Atkinson had inspected the cross-bred herds of three of the older members of the breeding syndicate and considered that 3/8 Brahman was the proportion most likely to serve his purpose. He had devised a breeding plan to achieve this objective and facilities for this programme were available on Wairuna. By 1943, Brahman-cross bullocks had already been marketed from Wairuna.

The spread of Brahman cattle across northern Australia became possible after November 1941 when CSIR permitted syndicate members to sell Brahman and cross-bred cattle outside their group. Of the original 18 Brahman and one 3/8 Santa Gertrudis bull, 16 were still alive and well in 1941. By 1943 there were 7794 progeny from these cattle. Kelley reported in 1948 that "within a seven year period, without propaganda and without regard to all possibilities... Zebu hybridization has extended from at least Rockhampton on the south, right along the coast to Townsville and thence to the Daintree River area. It appears to have leapt the Atherton Tableland but it has penetrated into Cape York Peninsula as far north as Coen. It has also penetrated the coastal range country behind Ingham and at Townsville has extended into the basaltic country above Charters Towers and Pentland. It cannot be accidental that the expansion has taken place principally in tick- infested coastal country". Atkinson had played a role in this dispersal through selling Wairuna cross-bred cattle to properties near Mount Molloy, Georgetown, Cooktown, Tully and Coen.

Atkinson increased the diversity of his herd through purchases within Queensland and overseas. During 1946 he purchased all the pure-bred Brahman from the Australian Estates Co Ltd property Millungera station, including the bull "Texas". He later purchased another CSIR syndicate bull, "Jake 315", from Glenprairie station. These, together with the cattle he had acquired earlier, made his total of 43 pure-breds the biggest of any pure-bred herd. His objective was to maintain a study of Brahman cattle and eventually have a 3/8s Brahman herd on his property. In 1947 Wairuna had a total of 850 head of pure and cross-bred Brahman cattle.

The CSIR had concluded in 1943 that any extension Brahman cross-breeding would require further importations to avoid inbreeding in the cross-bred population. Post-war, Atkinson and others followed this advice with further purchases of pure-bred Brahman from overseas to develop the breed. Between 1949 and 1951 Atkinson imported two Brahman bulls and two heifers from the USA. In 1950 Waverley Station, also imported Brahman cattle. By 1954, 49 head had been imported to Australia; however, importations were terminated in 1954 because of the outbreak of the disease bluetongue in the USA. It was not until 1981 when health protocols changed that importation from the USA recommenced and between then and 2002 more than 700 animals were imported.

Atkinson and Maurice De Tournouer of Wetherby station, Mt Molloy, established the first Brahman-related breeders association in Australia in 1946. The Australian Zebu Breeders' Society started with Atkinson as president (1946–1960) and Le Tournouer taking the secretary's position. In 1953 it was reported that "The system of registration being adopted by the Australian Zebu Breeders Society will fill an important need in Queensland's cattle industry.... The Australian society, comprising nine active breeder members with Mr K J Atkinson of Wairuna, Mt Garnet as president, has now applied for affiliation with the American society...".

In 1947 north Queensland graziers considered forming a syndicate to build saleyards to be worked on a co-operative basis for the benefit of pastoralists. Subsequently, the Primary Producers Cooperative was formed with Ken Atkinson as the first chairman of the board and on 2 April 1948 the company North Queensland Saleyards Co P/L (Mareeba Saleyard) was registered. The Mareeba Saleyard's first sale was held on 19 May 1948 and it continues to operate in 2013.

From the 1950s cattle-raising throughout most of north Queensland underwent a transformation. The 15 Year Meat Agreement between Britain and Australia provided good beef prices irrespective of market trends, which generated optimism and the confidence to embark on development work. In addition the Queensland Government began to insist on improvements as a condition of pastoral leases and took a more active role in the industry.

In 1952 Ken Atkinson was a foundation member of the Australian Zebu-Cross Beef Cattle Breeders Association (later the Australian Tropical Beef Breeders' Association) formed by his older brother, Robert La Mont Atkinson, and other Brahman breeders who were experimenting with cross breeding. The objective of the organisation was to improve the cross breeds to a high standard, and to collect, verify and publish information relating to them.

Between 1952 and 1954, Wairuna cattle were used for a study of comparative live weights and carcase weights and grades of beef using Brahman cross and British steers carried out by the Queensland Department of Agriculture and Stock (Dept A&S). As the four economic drivers of beef production in northern Australia are: survival, reproduction, weight gain, and carcass and meat quality, this trial was a quantitative test of three aspects of the suitability of Brahman type cattle for the north Australian cattle industry. The final weighing of the steers in the 2½ year-long weight trial took place during the first field day for north Queensland cattlemen, organised by the Mount Garnet branch of the Graziers' Association in co-operation with the Dept A&S, and held at Wairuna Homestead, in 1955. The study quantitatively showed the advantages of Brahman-cross beef compared with European breeds.

From 1960 Wairuna, with its cross-bred herd, was managed by Atkinson's eldest son, Jon, while Atkinson moved his Brahman stud cattle to the property Moana at Kuranda to be more easily accessible for buyers.

Industry improvements of the 1950s were followed during the 1960s and 1970s by a number of innovations higher degree of cattle control, provision of beef roads, increased emphasis on pasture management and the establishment of better adapted breeds such as Brahman and Brahman crosses including Santa Gertrudis. The ABBA continued to grow during the 1960s and 1970s. Its headquarters, Brahman House, Rockhampton (the former AMP Building), was officially opened on 20 August 1971 by the Association's patron Mr Edgar Hudgins of Hudgins Ranch, Texas, USA; making it the first beef cattle breed association in Australia to own its own building. By 1971 there were 26,900 purebred Brahmans and 57,800 Appendix registered Brahmans in Australia. During the early 1970s the ABBA's membership increased dramatically, exceeding 900 in 1972. With the increase in membership, cattle registration also increased dramatically, which in turn increased the genetic supply available to the commercial industry. Commonwealth Scientific and Industrial Research Organisation (CSIRO) and Queensland Department of Primary Industries (DPI) research underpinned the growth by demonstrating the biological basis for the Brahmans adaption.

From 1958 to 1959 the USA surpassed the United Kingdom as the principal market for Australian beef exports. Worldwide demand for beef caused Australian cattle prices to increase by 40% between 1969 and 1974. However, by 1975 world overproduction and political decisions in the USA and Japan led to the collapse of world beef prices and the decline of beef exports from Australia. Prices remained low until 1979, when new markets were established in Eastern Europe and the USSR, and new quotas were negotiated with the USA.

The development of tropically-adapted Brahman stock revolutionized the beef cattle industry in northern Australia. It transformed struggling enterprises into efficient and profitable ones and contributed billions of dollars to domestic and export income. In 2000 a Meat and Livestock Australia project assessed the contribution to the Australian economy by Brahman genetics. Analysis of the economic return on investment for the Australian beef industry from 1970 to 2000 found that Brahman and Bos indicus infusion delivered an additional individual on-farm benefit of $9170 per annum. About 40,000 Australian cattle producers gained from this additional profit in each of those 30 years. Brahman and Brahman-infused cattle accounted for 90 per cent of the genetic improvement in the Australian industry. The cumulative on-farm return since 1970 from investment in Bos indicus genetics amounted to $10.2 billion of a total on-farm return to the national beef industry from all forms of technology of $11 billion. In 2013 ABBA comprises over 1200 members and is the largest beef cattle breed association, by membership, in Australia. Currently, a little over 50% of the Australian beef cattle herd has Brahman blood, while about 11 per cent of the herd is pure-bred. There are about 110,000 Brahman bulls above the Tropic of Capricorn, that is, about 70% of bulls in that region.

Wairuna stud played a major role in the early era of Brahman cattle breeding. ABBA claims that "[o]ver the years probably every stud and station herd has had bulls and or females from Wairuna, Wetherby, Burnside, Dundee and the Orient [that] have left their mark on future generations of Brahman cattle. Today, if one traces a beast's registered breeding back far enough one or more of these studs' names will come up with bloodlines back to 1933 imports".

Without the contribution to the Brahman-cross experimentation conducted by the CSIR in conjunction with Queensland cattlemen, including Ken Atkinson, and the subsequent endeavours of individuals and organisations established to promote Brahman and Brahman-cross cattle, the north Australian cattle industry would not exist in its current form. Atkinson, working from Wairuna between 1936 and 1960, played an early, on-going and important role in the creation of Australian Brahman and Brahman cross-bred cattle. Accordingly, Ken Atkinson was awarded membership of the Order of Australia on 26 January 1983 in recognition of his service to primary industry. He died on 1 October 1990 and his ashes were interred in Wairuna cemetery beside his grandfather's grave.

Wairuna remained in the Atkinson family until 1976 when it was sold as a result of the beef cattle price collapse. Since then Wairuna has had several owners. At its last sale in 2010, Wairuna was purchased by the Queensland Government for national parks purposes.

Since the Atkinson era several buildings have been added to the Wairuna homestead, namely, the shed near the head stockman's house, an aviary and a four-bay shed adjacent to the butchering hut. These are not considered to be of cultural heritage significance.

Two natural disasters have affected Wairuna in recent years. In 2011 Cyclone Yasi, which caused considerable destruction along the Queensland coast and inland, damaged buildings at Wairuna Homestead and in 2012 fire damaged all five of Wairuna's outlying yards and dips, and boundary fences.

Wairuna Homestead, like all early pastoral properties, developed as a self-contained village with workers living on site in barracks and with buildings for self-sufficiency functions such as blacksmithing and butchering. Station employees included Aboriginal people as they were an important part of the functioning of pastoral properties in northern Queensland from the 1870s. Aboriginal people employed at Wairuna resided in barracks or lived with their families in a camp sited to the south-east of the homestead. Warrungu people have an active Native Title Land Claim over land including Wairuna.

The proposed demolition of Wairuna Homestead buildings by the Queensland Parks and Wildlife Services in May 2013 galvanised community members to attempt to gain protection for the homestead and cemetery through its entry in the Queensland Heritage Register. Submissions, petition and comment from community members, family members, former employees (including Aboriginal workers), and the Tablelands Regional Council resulted.

Further research will reveal more information about Wairuna's worker history, station and stud operations and the Atkinson family's role in the history of the north Queensland beef cattle industry.

== Description ==
Wairuna Station, located 117 kilometres (73 mi) south of Mount Garnet on Wairuna Road, is a 76,500-hectare (189,000-acre) property at the head of the Burdekin River adjoining the Girringun National Park. Eighteen kilometres from the north-western boundary of the Station, the approach through the scrub opens to provide a long view of the picturesque setting of Wairuna Homestead atop a knoll surrounded by lagoons and wetlands.

Wairuna homestead comprises the 1940 residence with attached early kitchen/store, a cottage of early construction and the 3-car garage/workshop oriented to overlook the approach from the north. Other ancillary structures located close to the south and east include: two barracks buildings; an amenities block; butchering hut; machinery shed; wash house/accommodation/generator shed and the remnants of a tank stand and oil shed and garden structures. The former stockman's house is located on another knoll to the south with the remains of the former stables, pig pen and other yards contained in the gully between. Remnants of the Aboriginal campsite are located on the flats about 200 metres (660 ft) south of the former stockman's house.

The 1940 residence is a robust single storey timber-framed building clad in chamferboards. Standing on a red-coloured concrete slab on fill it is covered by a low-pitched hipped corrugated sheet roof with half round ridge tiles and quad gutters, all of asbestos cement. Verandahs located on the north and east sides are supported on pairs of 150-millimetre (5.9 in) square posts finished with skirtings and capitals on capped concrete upstands. Along the verandahs, projecting porches with gabled hips distinguish the entrances when viewed from the main garden and driveway. The verandah walls and interior partition walls have exposed frames lined with vertical v-jointed tongue and groove boards and ceilings are lined with asbestos cement sheeting finished with timber cover battens.

The 1940 residence comprises six rooms with the former lounge and dining room to the east separated from four former bedrooms to the west by a central hall and lobby running from the front door to the kitchen at the rear. The lounge and dining room share a large double- sided fireplace of face-brick. Two of the former bedrooms retain built-in wardrobes, drawers and shelving. The walls throughout the house and onto the verandahs have a single lining of vertical v-jointed tongue and groove boards with ceilings lined in asbestos cement sheeting and finished with timber cover battens.

At the rear, the existing kitchen/store/verandah to which the 1940 residence was added retains its early cladding of ripple iron under fibre cement planks on the external walls and a bathroom has been added to the south-western corner.

The cottage is a single storey building on stumps with an exposed timber frame, 290-millimetre (11 in) wide chamferboard cladding and a hipped corrugated iron roof. It is a typical two room cottage with a 5-by-8-metre (16 ft × 26 ft) core with rooms of unequal size and symmetrically placed openings. The verandahs with lower pitched incorporated skillion roofs are later additions: those to the front and rear are of equal width, the rear with a corner room; and a wider side verandah enclosed as two rooms with 180-millimetre (7.1 in) wide chamferboards. A walkway with curved corrugated iron roof connects the cottage to the 1940 house.

The ancillary buildings to the south and east of the homestead and cottage are generic agricultural structures of basic design and construction built and modified since 1940. Most are timber framed, clad in corrugated iron or fibre cement sheeting and generally with concrete or earth floors. The former barracks building on the southern slope has a suspended timber floor and both it and the former stockman's house are clad in chamferboards with corrugated iron roofs.

Other components associated with the homestead are located at some distance from the main complex. The cemetery is located on the western side of the lagoon, about 500 metres (1,600 ft) from the homestead and contains the graves of James and Kenneth James Atkinson. The headstones are surrounded by a fence of decorative cast iron and mild steel with the large marble headstone of James Atkinson clearly visible from the homestead site.

A small number of structures including the four bay shed have been erected on the property since the Atkinson occupation of the station.

== Heritage listing ==
Wairuna Homestead was listed on the Queensland Heritage Register on 9 August 2013 having satisfied the following criteria.

The place is important in demonstrating the evolution or pattern of Queensland's history.

Wairuna Homestead with its complex of surviving structures and cemetery is important in Queensland history for its role in the development of Australia's beef cattle industry through early experimentation with Brahman cross-breeding and the creation of the Australian Brahman. These breeds have made an enormous contribution to the Australian beef cattle industry.

The place is important because of its aesthetic significance.

The aesthetic value of Wairuna Homestead is derived from its setting and views. Located high on a flood-free knoll overlooking and almost surrounded by wildlife-filled lagoons encircled by low hills, the views to and from Wairuna Homestead evoke tranquillity and a sense of seclusion and remoteness.

The place has a strong or special association with a particular community or cultural group for social, cultural or spiritual reasons.

Wairuna Homestead has a special association with descendants of James Atkinson, former employees and community members as a valued place of former employment, residence and connection. This has been demonstrated by the response from former residents, employees, the regional council and members of the wider Queensland community to the threatened demolition of homestead buildings in May 2013.

The place has a special association with the life or work of a particular person, group or organisation of importance in Queensland's history.

Wairuna Homestead is important for its association for 95 years with James Atkinson and his descendants, a family which made a significant contribution to Queensland's beef cattle industry.

Wairuna Homestead has a special association with Kenneth James Atkinson, who is of importance in Queensland's history through his role in the Brahman cross-breeding experimentation conducted by the Council for Scientific and Industrial Research (CSIR) (1930s-1950s); in the establishment and development of the Australian Brahman cattle breed; for his establishment of the Australian Brahman Breeders' Association of which he was foundation president (1946–1960); and for his role in the establishment of the North Queensland Saleyards Pty Ltd of which he was the founding chairman (1947–1976).
