= Helens Hill, Queensland =

Helens Hill
- Suburb
- Interactive map of Helens Hill
- Coordinates: 18.7873°S 146.125°E
- Country: Australia
- State: Queensland
- LGA: Shire of Hinchinbrook
- Location: 14.0 km (8.7 mi) S of Ingham; 97.5 km (60.6 mi) NW of Townsville; 249 km (155 mi) S of Cairns; 1,455 km (904 mi) NNW of Brisbane

Government
  - State electorate: Hinchinbrook
  - Federal division: Kennedy

Area
  - Total: 123.4 km^{2} (47.6 sq mi)

Population
  - Total: 118 (2021 census)
  - Density: 0.956/km^{2} (2.477/sq mi)
- Time zone: UTC+10:00 (AEST)
- Postcode: 4850
Suburbs around Helens Hill
| Wharps | Wharps | Toobanna |
| Upper Stone | Helens Hill | Orient |
| Upper Stone | Yuruga | Yuruga |

Helens Hill is a rural locality in the Shire of Hinchinbrook, Queensland, Australia. In the 2021 census, Helens Hill had a population of 118 people.

== Geography ==
Despite the name, Helens Hill is predominantly flat farming land (approx 20 metres above sea level), well-watered by numerous small creeks and is used for growing sugarcane. Mount Helen (also known as Helens Hill) rises to 227 metres (745 ft) in the locality (18.7719°S 146.1518°E) and presumably is the origin of the locality's name.

The Bruce Highway passes through the locality from the south (Yuruga) to the north-east (Toobanna).

The North Coast railway line passes through the locality from the south-east (Yuruga) to the north-east (Toobanna) with Pombel railway station (18.7590°S 146.1546°E) serving the locality. Previously there were two other railway stations on the North Coast line within the locality, but both of these have been abandoned:

- Burgamoo railway station (18.7422°S 146.1480°E)
- Helens Hill railway station (18.7673°S 146.1605°E)

A cane tramway delivers harvested sugarcane to the local sugar mills at Victoria Plantation and Macknade.

== History ==
Helens Hill State School opened on 17 August 1931. The school closed on 31 December 2016. It was at 48388 Bruce Highway (18.7690°S 146.1352°E). The school's website was archived.

== Demographics ==
In the 2016 census, Helens Hill had a population of 123 people.

In the 2021 census, Helens Hill had a population of 118 people.

== Education ==
There are no schools in Helens Hill. The nearest government primary school is Toobanna State School in neighbouring Toobanna to the north-west. The nearest government secondary school is Ingham State High School in Ingham to the north. There are also non-government schools in Ingham.
