= County of Dagmar =

Dagmar Queensland
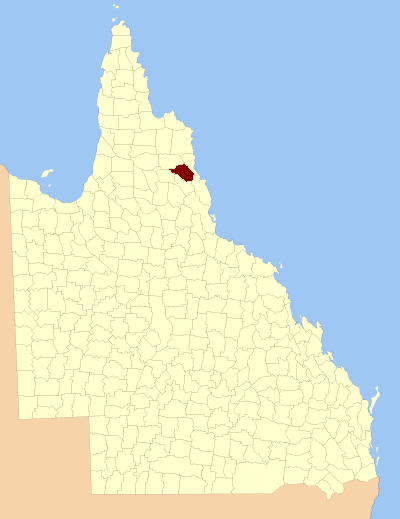
- Location within Queensland
Lands administrative divisions around Dagmar:
Chelmsford	Solander	Solander
Wrotham	Dagmar	Nares
Hodgkinson	Hodgkinson	Nares

The county of Dagmar is a cadastral division of Queensland north-west of Cairns. It contains the town of Julatten.

On 7 March 1901, the Governor issued a proclamation legally dividing Queensland into counties under the Land Act 1897. Its schedule described Dagmar thus:

Bounded on the north-west by the county of Chelmsford; on the south-west and south by the Mitchell and Hodgkinson Rivers upwards to Deep Creek, by that creek upwards to its head, and by the northern watershed of the Hodgkinson River easterly to the western watershed of the Barron River; and on the east and north-east by the Coast Range northerly to the county of Chelmsford.

== Parishes ==
Dagmar is subdivided into parishes, listed as follows:

Parish	LGA	Coordinates
Buringan	Mareeba	16°39′S 144°48′E
Cudgee	Mareeba	16°36′S 145°01′E
Garioch	Mareeba	16°40′S 145°23′E
Gorilbee	Mareeba	16°33′S 144°42′E
Kanawarra	Mareeba	16°25′S 145°08′E
Koobaba	Mareeba	16°25′S 145°00′E
Layland	Mareeba	16°48′S 145°06′E
Mappe	Mareeba	16°31′S 145°04′E
Mar	Mareeba	16°48′S 145°20′E
Northedge	Mareeba	16°42′S 145°12′E
Riflemead	Mareeba	16°35′S 145°16′E
Southedge	Mareeba	16°56′S 145°19′E
Talgijah	Mareeba	16°29′S 144°52′E
Tregoora	Mareeba	16°31′S 144°31′E
Watangay	Mareeba	16°47′S 144°56′E
