= Long Pocket, Queensland =

Long Pocket
- Suburb
- Interactive map of Long Pocket
- Coordinates: 18.5176°S 145.9758°E
- Country: Australia
- State: Queensland
- LGA: Shire of Hinchinbrook
- Location: 24.1 km (15.0 mi) NW of Ingham; 135 km (84 mi) NW of Townsville; 260 km (160 mi) S of Cairns; 1,482 km (921 mi) NNW of Brisbane

Government
  - State electorate: Hinchinbrook
  - Federal division: Kennedy

Area
  - Total: 43.9 km^{2} (16.9 sq mi)

Population
  - Total: 150 (2021 census)
  - Density: 3.42/km^{2} (8.85/sq mi)
- Time zone: UTC+10:00 (AEST)
- Postcode: 4850
Suburbs around Long Pocket
| Abergowrie | Abergowrie | Abergowrie |
| Garrawalt | Long Pocket | Dalrymple Creek |
| Lannercost | Lannercost | Lannercost |

Long Pocket is a rural locality in the Shire of Hinchinbrook, Queensland, Australia. In the 2021 census, Long Pocket had a population of 150 people.

== History ==
Long Pocket State School opened on 26 July 1915. A new school building was erected in 1924. It closed on 14 February 1994. It was at 2062 Abergowrie Road (18.5419°S 146.0194°E), now in neighbouring Lannercost.

== Demographics ==
In the 2016 census, Long Pocket had a population of 198 people, 49% female and 51% male. The median age of the population was 38 years, on par with the national median. 88.4% of people living in Long Pocket were born in Australia. The other top responses for country of birth were New Zealand 1.6% and Italy 1.6%. 93.3% of people spoke only English at home; there were no other responses for language spoken at home.

In the 2021 census, Long Pocket had a population of 150 people, 51% female and 49% male. The median age of the population was 47 years, 9 years above the national median of 38. 86% of people living in Long Pocket were born in Australia. The other top responses for country of birth were New Zealand 2.0% and Italy 2.0%. 94.7% of people spoke only English at home; the next most common language was Italian at 2%.

== Education ==
There are no schools in Long Pocket. The nearest government primary school is Trebonne State School in neighbouring Trebonne to the south-east. The nearest government secondary school is Ingham State High School in Ingham to the south-east.

== Community groups ==
The Abergowrie-Long Pocket branch of the Queensland Country Women's Association meets at 2346 Abergowrie Road (18.5215°S 146.0033°E).
