= Toobanna, Queensland =

Toobanna
- Town
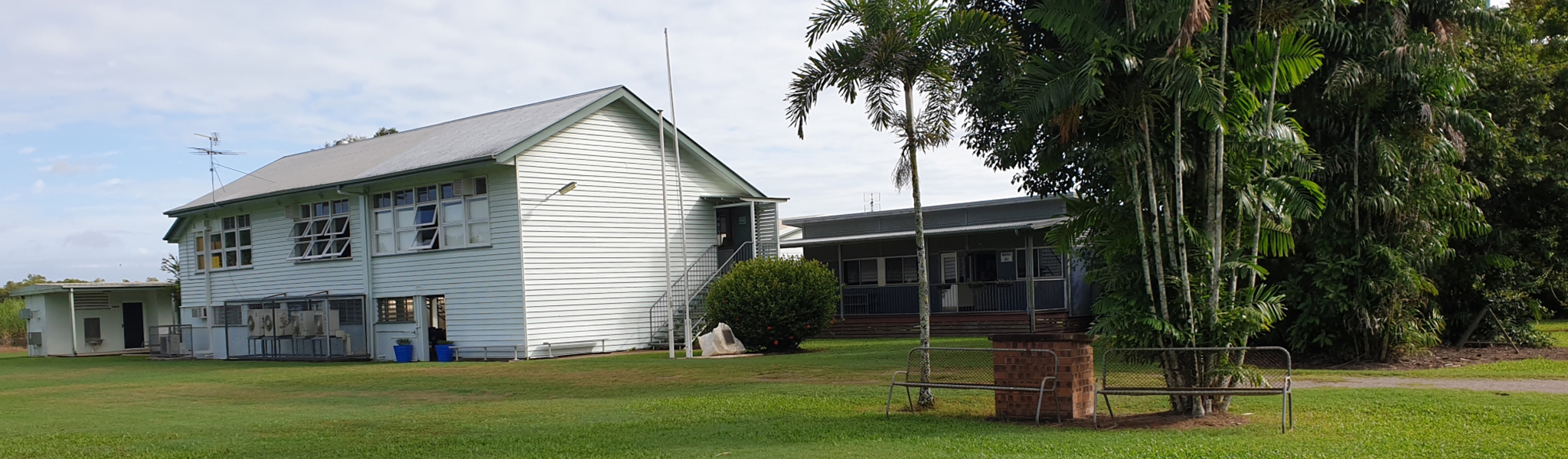
- Toobanna State School, 2024

- Interactive map of Toobanna
- Coordinates: 18.7163°S 146.1486°E
- Country: Australia
- State: Queensland
- LGA: Shire of Hinchinbrook
- Location: 7.3 km (4.5 mi) S of Ingham; 104 km (65 mi) NW of Townsville; 243 km (151 mi) S of Cairns; 1,454 km (903 mi) NNW of Brisbane

Government
  - State electorate: Hinchinbrook
  - Federal division: Kennedy

Area
  - Total: 39.4 km^{2} (15.2 sq mi)

Population
  - Total: 276 (2021 census)
  - Density: 7.005/km^{2} (18.14/sq mi)
- Time zone: UTC+10:00 (AEST)
- Postcode: 4850
Localities around Toobanna
Trebonne	Ingham	Blackrock
Wharps	Toobanna	Blackrock
Wharps	Helens Hill	Orient

Toobanna is a rural town and locality in the Shire of Hinchinbrook, Queensland, Australia. In the 2021 census, the locality of Toobanna had a population of 276 people.

== Geography ==
The town is roughly in the centre of the locality. The eastern boundary of the locality is Trebonne Creek, which then flows through the locality, just to the south of the town, and then forms the north-western boundary, ultimately being a tributary of the Herbert River which flows into the Coral Sea. The southern boundary is Cattle Creek, which ultimately flows into the Coral Sea.

The locality is generally flat and low-lying (10 metres (33 feet) above sea level). It is freehold land which is used for farming with sugarcane being a major crop.

The Bruce Highway and the North Coast railway line traverse the locality from south to north, passing just near the town, the railway being immediately parallel and east of the highway. The town is served by the Toobanna railway station as well as private sugarcane tramways.

== History ==
The town takes its name from its railway station, which was named by the Queensland Railways Department on 19 April 1916. The name Toobanna is said to be an Aboriginal word, meaning plenty of big rushes (reeds) near the water.

Toobanna State School opened on 16 August 1922.

== Demographics ==
In the 2016 census, the locality of Toobanna had a population of 278 people.

In the 2021 census, the locality of Toobanna had a population of 276 people.

== Education ==
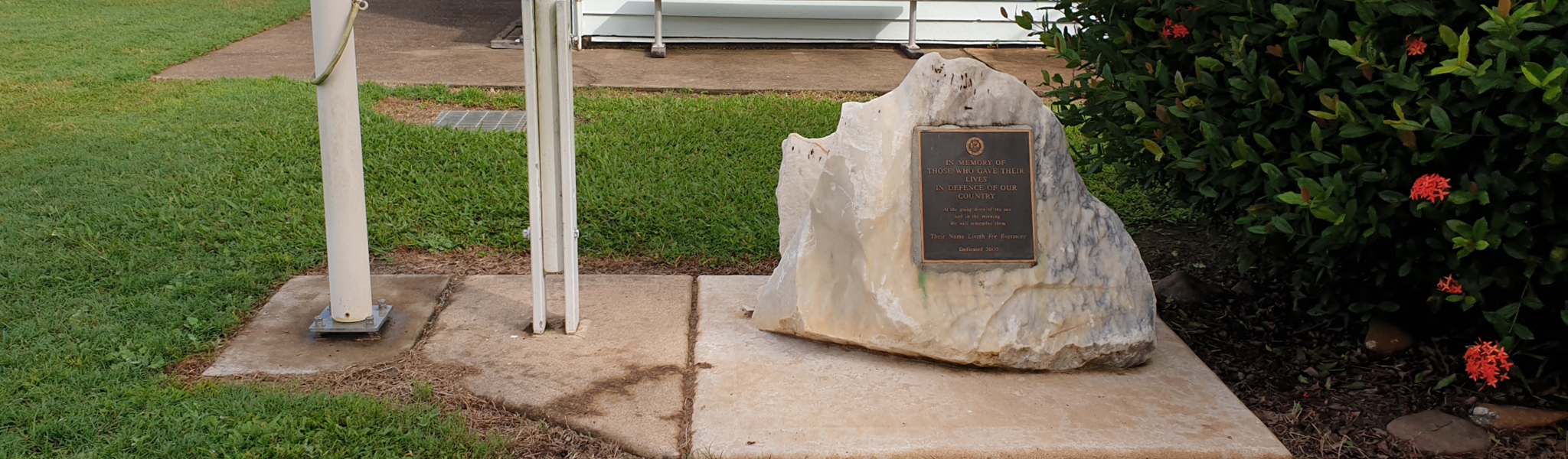
War memorial, Toobanna State School, 2024

Toobanna State School is a government primary (Prep-6) school for boys and girls at 49049 Bruce Highway (18.7121°S 146.1478°E). In 2016, the school had enrolment of 21 students with 3 teachers (2 full-time equivalent) and 6 non-teaching staff (2 full-time equivalent). In 2018, the school had an enrolment of 6 students with 2 teachers (1 full-time equivalent) and 4 non-teaching staff (2 full-time equivalent).

There are no secondary schools in Toobanna. The nearest government secondary school is Ingham State High School in Ingham to the north. There are also non-government schools in Ingham.
