= Trebonne =

- Town
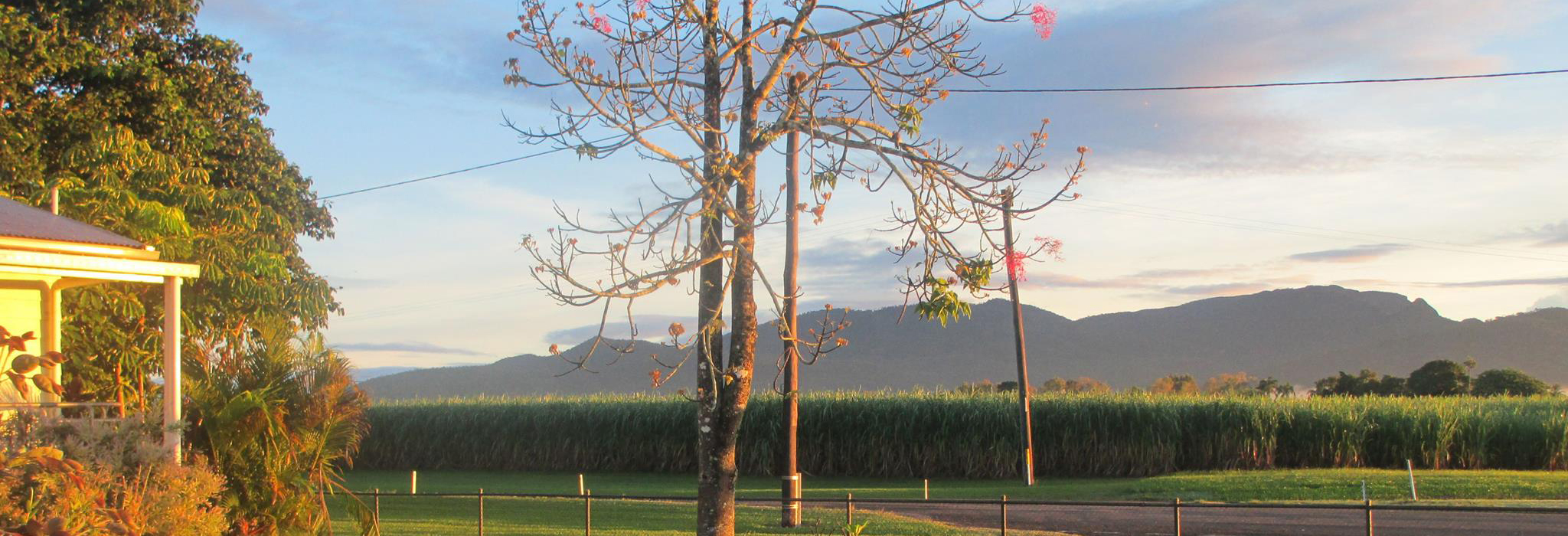
- Trebonne landscape, 2024

- Interactive map of Trebonne
- Coordinates: 18.6266°S 146.0788°E
- Country: Australia
- State: Queensland
- LGA: Shire of Hinchinbrook
- Location: 9.0 km (5.6 mi) NW of Ingham; 120 km (75 mi) NW of Townsville; 1,472 km (915 mi) NNW of Brisbane

Government
  - State electorate: Hinchinbrook
  - Federal division: Kennedy

Area
  - Total: 58.6 km^{2} (22.6 sq mi)

Population
  - Total: 430 (2021 census)
  - Density: 7.34/km^{2} (19.01/sq mi)
- Time zone: UTC+10:00 (AEST)
- Postcode: 4850
Localities around Trebonne
Lannercost	Hawkins Creek	Hawkins Creek
Lannercost	Trebonne	Ingham
Peacock Siding	Wharps	Toobanna

Trebonne is a rural town and locality in the Shire of Hinchinbrook, Queensland, Australia. In the 2021 census, the locality of Trebonne had a population of 430 people.

== History ==
Prior to European settlement, the Trebonne area was inhabited by the Warakamai People.

The town derives its name from Trebonne Creek, which was allegedly named by Leon Burguez, sugar planter who lived at Gairloch, probably in the 1870s.

Upper Trebonne Provisional School opened on 7 November 1906. On 1 January 1909, it became Upper Trebonne State School. It was renamed Trebonne State School circa 1932.

In 1951, Canossa Catholic Primary School was established by Canossia Daughters of Charity. It closed on 6 December 2013. It was at 11 Stone River Road (18.6273°S 146.0779°E).

In 1966, the Canossia sisters opened an aged care facility. In May 2022, the last two sisters in the order, then both aged 77 years, were withdrawn from Trebonne with OzCare taking over the operation of the facility.

== Demographics ==
In the 2011 census, the town of Trebonne had a population of 319 people, 51.4% female and 48.6% male. The median age of the population was 55 years, 18 years above the national median of 37. 74.8% of people living in Trebonne were born in Australia. The other top responses for country of birth were Italy 15.1%, Philippines 2.5%, England 1.6%, Germany 1.3% and Malta 1.3%. 71.5% of people spoke only English at home; the next most common languages were 21.9% Italian, 1.9% Basque, 1.3% Greek, 1.3% Spanish and 1.3% Maltese.

In the 2016 census, the locality of Trebonne had a population of 397 people, 52.6% female and 47.4% male. The median age of the population was 53 years, 15 years above the national median of 38. 79.1% of people living in Trebonne were born in Australia. The other top responses for country of birth were Italy 9.7%, Philippines 2.2%, New Zealand 1.2%, England 0.7% and Malta 0.7%. 81.1% of people spoke only English at home; the next most common languages were 13.8% Italian, 1.0% Ilonggo (Hiligaynon), 1.0% Non-verbal, so described, 0.8% Spanish and 0.8% Filipino.

In the 2021 census, the locality of Trebonne had a population of 430 people, 52.6% female and 47.4% male. The median age of the population was 58 years, 20 years above the national median of 38. 81.6% of people living in Trebonne were born in Australia. The other top responses for country of birth were Italy 8.4%, Spain 1.2%, India 1.2%, Nepal 0.9% and Malta 0.7%. 81.6% of people spoke only English at home; the next most common languages were 11.2% Italian, 1.2% Basque, 0.9% Nepali and 0.9% Punjabi.

== Heritage listings ==
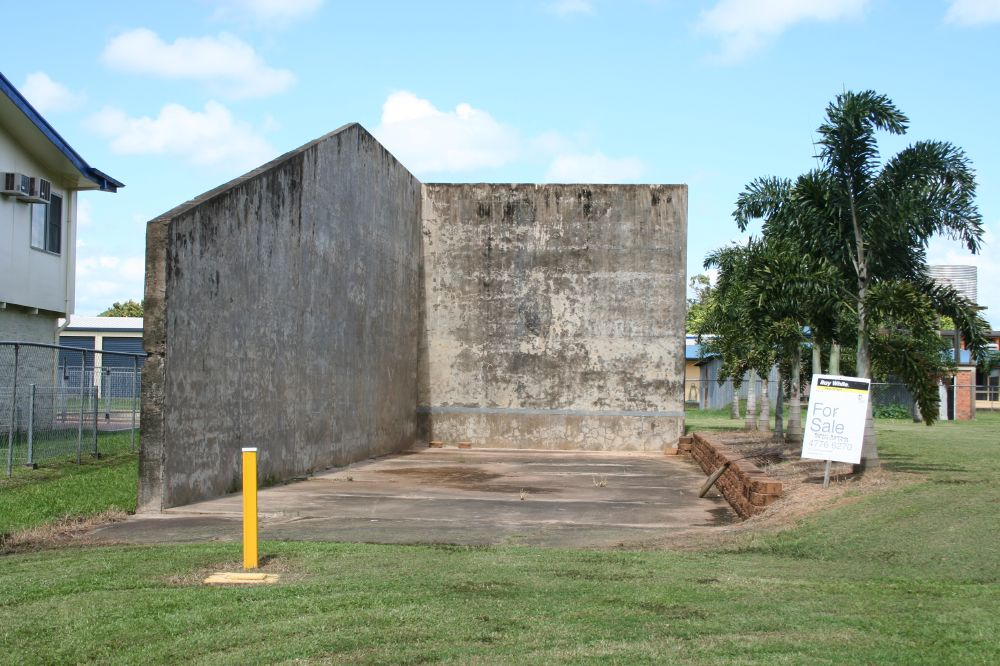
Pelota Mano Court, 2007

Trebonne has a number of heritage-listed sites, including:

- Pelota Mano Court, Trebonne Road

== Education ==
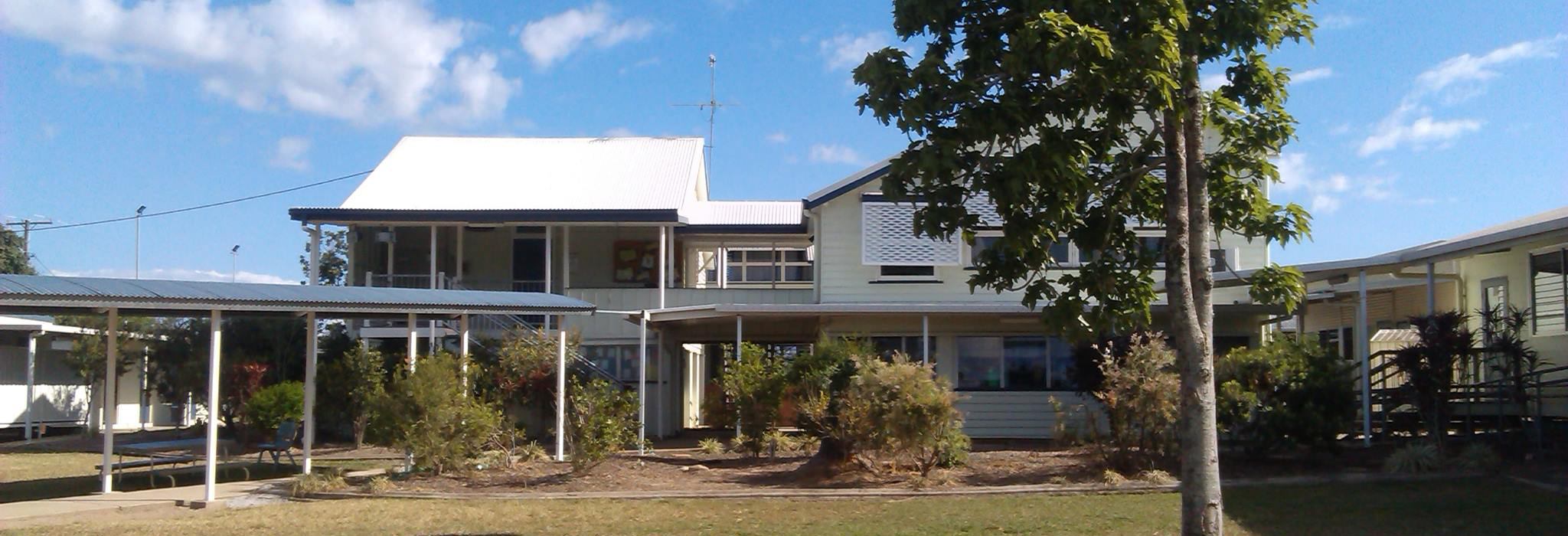
Trebonne State School, 2024

Trebonne State School is a government primary (Prep-6) school for boys and girls at 71 Stone River Road (18.6308°S 146.0747°E). In 2017, the school had an enrolment of 19 students with 3 teachers (2 full-time equivalent) and 6 non-teaching staff (3 full-time equivalent). In 2022, the school had an enrolment of 16 students.

There are no secondary schools in Trebonne. The nearest government secondary school is Ingham State High School in neighbouring Ingham to the east.
