= Paluma =

Paluma may refer to:

Places in Queensland, Australia

- Paluma, Queensland, a township
- Paluma Dam, part of the water supply system for the city of Townsville
- Paluma Important Bird Area

Ships

- HMAS Paluma, various ships of the Royal Australian Navy
- Paluma class survey motor launch, four hydrographic survey launches of the Royal Australian Navy

== See also ==
- Paluma Range National Park, Queensland
- Paloma (disambiguation)
