= Crystal Creek, Queensland =

Crystal Creek
- Suburb
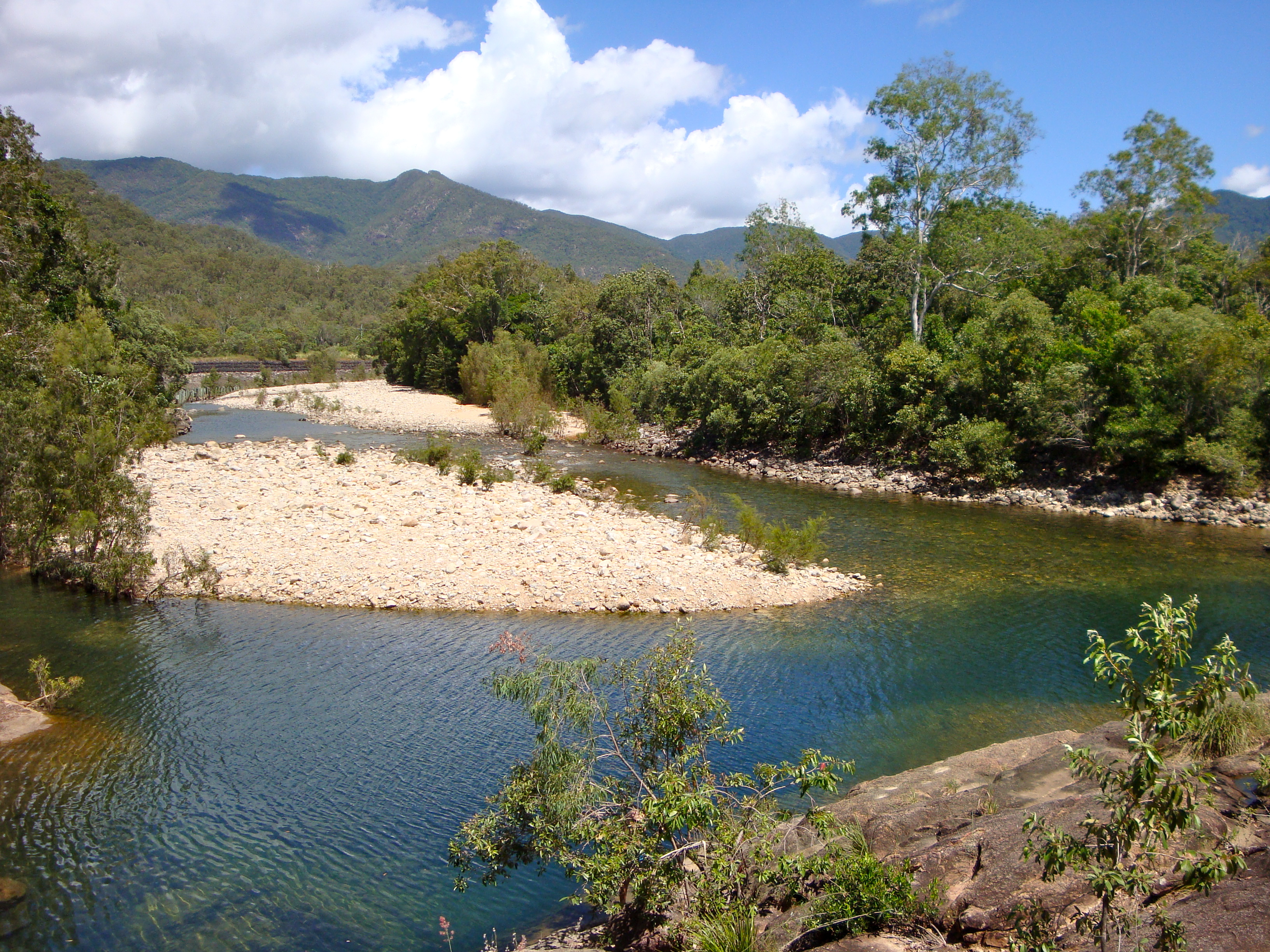
- Big Crystal Creek, 2009

- Interactive map of Crystal Creek
- Coordinates: 19.0219°S 146.2747°E
- Country: Australia
- State: Queensland
- LGA: City of Townsville
- Location: 13.4 km (8.3 mi) SW of Mutarnee; 23.7 km (14.7 mi) NW of Rollingstone; 55.8 km (34.7 mi) SSW of Ingham; 77.3 km (48.0 mi) NW of Townsville; 1,433 km (890 mi) NNW of Brisbane

Government
  - State electorate: Hinchinbrook
  - Federal division: Kennedy

Area
  - Total: 211.2 km^{2} (81.5 sq mi)

Population
  - Total: 0 (2021 census)
  - Density: 0.0000/km^{2} (0.000/sq mi)
- Time zone: UTC+10:00 (AEST)
- Postcode: 4816
Suburbs around Crystal Creek
Paluma	Bambaroo	CoolbieCoolbie
Paluma	Crystal Creek	Mutarnee; Rollingstone
Paluma	Paluma	Clemant

Crystal Creek is a rural locality in the City of Townsville, Queensland, Australia. In the 2021 census, Crystal Creek had "no people or a very low population".

== Geography ==
The Paluma Range National Park occupies most of the locality with the Paluma State Forest in the north-west of the locality. The small amount of remaining land use is grazing on native vegetation.

There are a number of local places within Crystal Creek:

- Gardes Hut (18.95°S 146.2°E), a clearing from an early settlement
- Johnstones Hut (18.95°S 146.2°E), a clearing from an early settlement
- Mango Tree (18.9825°S 146.2361°E)
- The Saddle (19.0005°S 146.2608°E)

=== Mountains ===
Crystal Creek has the following mountains (from north to south):

- Mount Spec (18.9414°S 146.1878°E), rising to 995 metres (3,264 ft) above sea level
- Mount Leach (18.9581°S 146.2161°E) 938 metres (3,077 ft)
- The Saddle (18.9988°S 146.2622°E) 510 metres (1,670 ft)
- Circle View Mountain (19.0566°S 146.2979°E) 831 metres (2,726 ft)
- Mount Halifax (19.1136°S 146.3734°E) 1,063 metres (3,488 ft)

== Demographics ==
In the 2016 census, Crystal Creek had a population of 10 people.

In the 2021 census, Crystal Creek had "no people or a very low population".

== Heritage listings ==
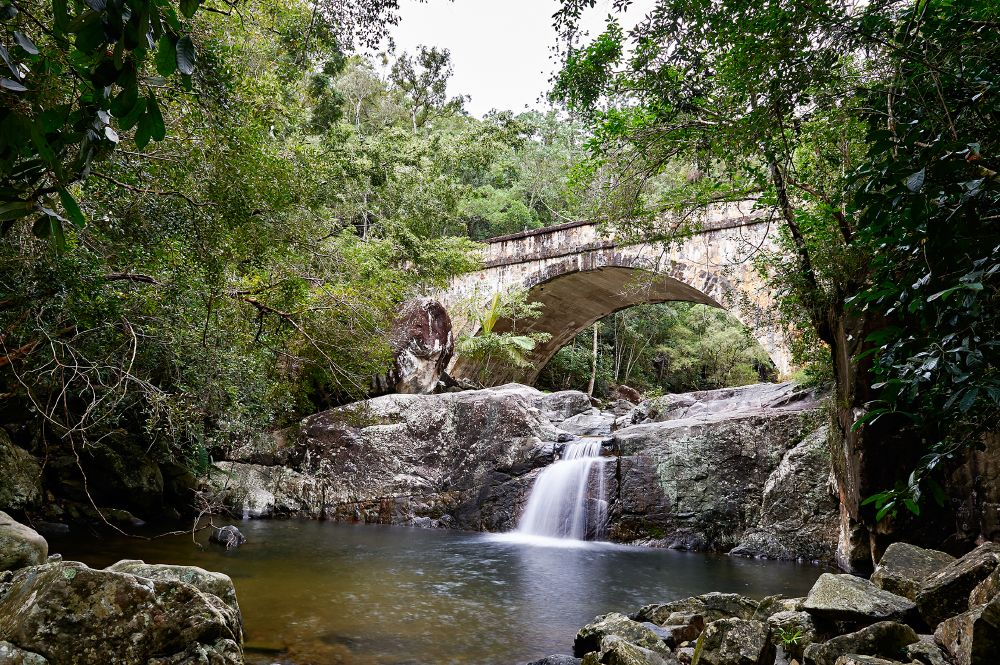
Little Crystal Creek bridge, 2016

Crystal Creek has a number of heritage-listed sites, including:

- Little Crystal Creek Bridge, Mount Spec Road (19.0°S 146.2505°E)

== Attractions ==
Crystal Creek (the creek from which the suburb takes its name) is a major tourist attraction in the area with swimming holes around the bridge.

There are a number of lookouts in the locality, including:

- Foxlees Lookout (18.95°S 146.2166°E)
- Witts Lookout (19.0000°S 146.2166°E)

== Education ==
There are no schools in Crystal Creek. The nearest government primary schools are Mutarnee State School in neighbouring Mutarnee to the east and Rollingstone State School in Rollingstone, also to the east. The nearest government secondary schools are Ingham State High School in Ingham to the north and Northern Beaches State High School in Deeragun, Townsville, to the south-east.
