= Mount Spec Road and Little Crystal Creek Bridge =

Historic road and bridge in Queensland, Australia

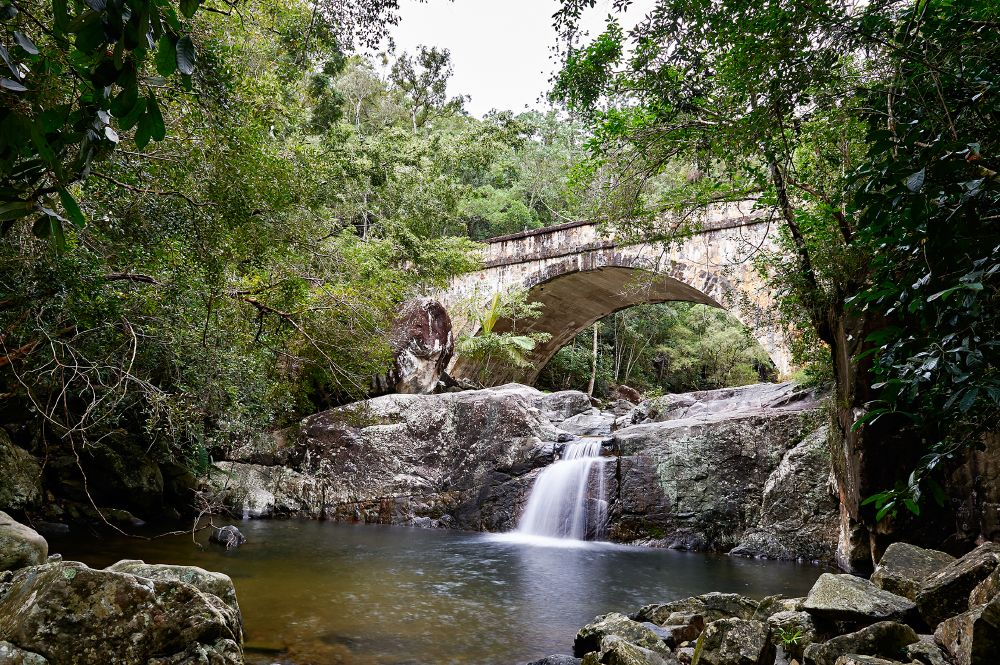
- Mount Spec Road over Little Crystal Creek Bridge, 2016

- Location within Queensland
- 19.0°S 146.2505°E
- Location: Crystal Creek, City of Townsville, Queensland, Australia

History
- Design period: 1919–1930s (interwar period)
- Built: 1930–1936

Queensland Heritage Register
- Official name: Mt Spec Road and Little Crystal Creek Bridge
- Type: state heritage (built, landscape)
- Designated: 30 October 2008
- Reference no.: 602652
- Significant period: 1930s (fabric); 1930s–ongoing (historical use)

Little Crystal Creek Bridge
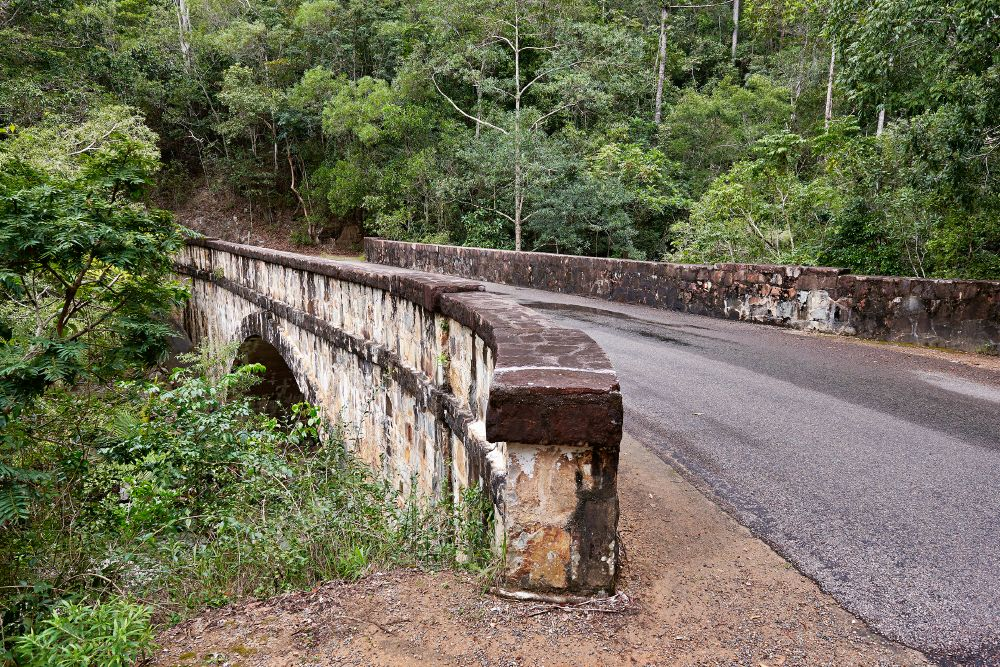
- Mount Spec Road crossing Little Crystal Creek Bridge, 2016
- Coordinates: 19.0°S 146.2505°E
- Carries: Motor vehicles,
- Crosses: Little Crystal Creek
- Locale: Paluma, North Queensland, Australia

Characteristics
- Design: Arch bridge
- Material: Stone-faced Concrete
- No. of spans: 1

History
- Construction start: January 1932
- Construction end: June 1933

Location
- Interactive map of Little Crystal Creek Bridge

Mount Spec Road and Little Crystal Creek Bridge is a heritage-listed road from Mutarnee to Paluma with a bridge over Little Crystal Creek at Crystal Creek, City of Townsville, Queensland, Australia. The bridge is 61 kilometres (38 mi) north of Townsville and provides access to the Paluma Range National Park. The road and the bridge were constructed between 1930 and 1936 under the Unemployment Relief Scheme during the Great Depression. They were added to the Queensland Heritage Register on 30 October 2008.

== History ==
Mount Spec Road and Little Crystal Creek Bridge, Crystal Creek, are situated in north Queensland, 61 kilometres (38 mi) north of Townsville. Mount Spec Road stretches some 18 kilometres (11 mi) from its junction with the old Bruce Highway to the western outskirts of Paluma. It provides access from the coastal plain, just 5 kilometres (3.1 mi) wide in this area, to the Paluma Range, which rises some 1,000 metres (3,300 ft) above the Big Crystal Creek floodplain. The concrete arch bridge over Little Crystal Creek is a prominent feature of the landscape in this area, and is located about halfway along the Mount Spec Road. The bridge is a very common subject for photography by locals and visitors, and Little Crystal Creek is one of the most popular natural destinations for residents of the city of Townsville.

Lobbying to build the Mount Spec Road took place over some 30 or so years, against a background of philosophical ideas of "progress" and "settlement" and the need for access to the areas west of Paluma for tin miners, timber cutters and farmers ("farmers access roads"), to the Paluma/Crystal Creek area itself for tourists and as a water supply for Townsville. This lobbying and the prolonged debate over the eventual location and construction of the road were also linked with the need to preserve features of the natural landscape. It took place amongst considerable controversy.

The earliest European access to what is now Paluma probably followed Aboriginal pathways, and there were six tracks in the Herbert district in the 1880s and 1890s that provided direct access to Mount Spec. However, only a few of these tracks were suitable for horses; most were foot tracks, and the easiest access to the forest in this area of broken topography was from the west.

In 1875 tin was discovered west of Paluma. It was soon realised that a good access road was required not only for the tin miners but also for visitors to the ranges, as the scenic beauty and temperate climate of the Paluma Range had been noted since the early 1900s. The Paluma Range area had been promoted for tourism and as a health resort from as early as 1902, when a correspondent from the North Queensland Herald visited the Mount Spec tin mines. The North Queensland Register of 28 July 1913 suggested that a township be gazetted at Cloudy Clearing, the original name for the site of Paluma, that a sanitarium be established in the ranges, and that "the scrub" be protected.

Successful Townsville businessman, REA McKimmin, wrote in 1913 of the scenic attractions of Mount Spec: "...I have seen most of the Southern Beauty Spots...and have no hesitation in stating that Mount Spec would surpass them all in every way if properly opened up...the wonderful change of climate compared to Townsville during the summer months is difficult to describe...".

Similarly, Phillip Foxlee, a Mount Spec tin miner, wrote to Queensland Premier Ted Theodore in 1925:

"All the water comes pouring through this Gorge in one channel at the mouth...this Gorge [is] two miles wide for almost its entire length...and [is] crammed full of waterfalls on every side...I think eventually we will have people from all parts of the world through that Gorge and circle round back to Mount Spec...it is likely to be a National Park."

Public interest in mountain retreats had endured from colonial times, when the summer's heat was to be avoided and recuperation at higher, cooler altitudes was prescribed for diseases such as tuberculosis, a trend which continued during World War II, when patients of the disease were still privately recuperating in Paluma. Mount Spec had become a popular weekend destination for visitors from Townsville and Ingham after World War I, and a series of "ranches" and guesthouses had appeared long before the road was constructed. Most of these visitors walked in on foot, just as the tin miners had done.

By 1920, the need to provide all-weather roads was a priority for Queenslanders, a response to the increased number of motor vehicles on the roads, and to the need to provide suitable infrastructure for an expanding economy. Queensland roads were in a deplorable condition, the result of haphazard planning by the then responsible but under-funded local government authorities. In the development of a road network, Queensland lagged far behind the other states. In response, the Queensland Government established the Main Roads Board in 1920 to oversee the construction of connecting roads and bridges and to provide funding to the local authorities involved. In 1925, the Main Roads Board became the Main Roads Commission under John Robert Kemp as Commissioner and continued the overseeing of road and bridge construction throughout Queensland. The Main Roads Board quickly realised that road and bridge specifications and other standards were urgently required to improve the quality of construction and establish a uniformity of practice. Road standards were therefore established, introducing three classifications of roads in 1925 and a single standard bridge design in 1922–1923. Two years later alternative designs were added to cater for different loadings, labelled First Class (later A Class) and Second Class (B Class). These standards did not change significantly over the next 80 years.

The Main Roads Act 1920 provided that responsibility for roads and bridges be shared between local and state authorities, ensuring that road planning and building was coordinated beyond the scope of individual local authorities. Under the Act, roads could be gazetted as Main Roads outside towns if they were trunk roads joining towns which were not yet connected by railway; feeder roads linking farming areas to the existing rail network; and developmental roads, which were to open to closer settlement new areas of Crown Land. Under amendments to the Main Roads Act 1920, several new categories of declared roads were added, including in 1929–1930 Tourist Roads, which were intended to open up areas to tourist traffic. Seven Tourist Roads had been declared by June 1930, although limited work had been carried out on them, and these included the Mount Spec Road, which therefore is one of the earliest declared Tourist Roads in Queensland. The inclusion of Mount Spec Road as a Tourist Road was largely due to influential Townsville businessmen, who with varied commercial, political and personal motives had brought together the various stakeholders to lobby for the construction of the road.

The newly formed Main Roads Board and subsequent Commission were anxious to make a mark, a factor exploited by the various lobby groups around Townsville. These included organisations such as the Royal Automobile Club of Queensland (RACQ), which arose from the growth in motor vehicle traffic and had a particularly active membership in Townsville in the late 1920s, and the Townsville and District Development Association, which had been campaigning since the early years of the twentieth century for the Queensland Government to open Mount Spec to settlement.

Townsville City Council was a powerful advocate for the construction of the Mount Spec Road. Mayor William Herbert Green saw the potential of Mount Spec as a water catchment for Townsville, because in the 1920s Townsville's water supply could not meet demand, and access to a guaranteed supply was required for the growing population. Although the motivation to improve access to the ranges was both the quantity and quality of the water at Mount Spec, financial constraints and the location of the area outside Townsville City Council's jurisdiction within the Shires of Thuringowa and Hinchinbrook resulted in an unwillingness to commit Townsville City's own funds to the construction of the road. Many of Townsville City and neighbouring Councils' concerns' over financial responsibility for the proposed road were relieved by its gazettal as a Tourist Road in October 1929. Nevertheless, Mayor Green's vision for Mount Spec as a water supply for Townsville was not met until the end of 1954, with the official opening of the first pipeline from Big Crystal Creek to Townsville and later with the construction of the Paluma Dam in the 1960s.

The construction of the Mount Spec Road finally came down to the State Government's need to deliver unemployment relief during the Great Depression and to provide quick scenic access to the proposed township at Cloudy Clearing in the ranges, for which Townsville branches of the Country and Progressive National Party had lobbied the Minister for Lands in 1931. There was otherwise mixed support for the road and its perceived benefits compared to its potential costs, particularly following the release of the Report of the Royal Commission on the Development of North Queensland in 1931. The purported economic benefits of the road were not clearly demonstrated. For example, potential timber reserves could be accessed by the road, a point made forcefully by state foresters to the Royal Commission, but logging areas within the Mount Spec State Forest had only been gazetted in the 1920s, the full extent of the timber reserves was unknown and the timber industry was only just beginning. Furthermore, tin mining was suffering a downturn, and the possibilities for farming on the tableland around Mount Spec that had been promoted by the Townsville and District Development Association were not readily apparent, with the only evidence that it was viable being fruits and vegetables grown in miners' clearings.

Finally, after an expedition into the ranges in 1924 by Townsville City Council and the RACQ, a motion was passed to request the Main Roads Board to undertake a survey of a road to Mount Spec, which was eventually carried out between 1929 and 1931. In November 1930, construction of the Mount Spec Road began with the clearing of about 5 miles (8.0 km) of track from the railway line to the base of the Paluma Range. The new Main Roads Commission was responsible for surveying, designing and supervising the construction of the road. Apart from a few contractors, the only permanent staff were Commission employees. Labour was mostly unskilled and drawn from the region's unemployed men under Unemployment Relief Scheme funds that the Government insisted the Main Roads Commission deploy as a way of easing unemployment. The construction of the Mount Spec Road was the largest Unemployment Relief project in the region.

The project was labour-intensive took five years to complete. Working conditions were hard and isolated. Initially, all workers were located in one large camp near the base of the range, No. 1 Camp, where a pipeworks was erected on Ollera Creek. There were four major campsites throughout the duration of the project, but it is difficult to determine the total number of camps accurately because, as work progressed, smaller satellite campsites were established near where significant work, such as the construction of concrete arch culverts, was being undertaken. Mango and lemon trees and passionfruit vines previously marked the locations of these campsites, but these have mostly been removed, so that it is now difficult to determine where the campsites were situated on the ground. The campsite at The Saddle, some 10.1 kilometres (6.3 mi) from the start of the road, was quite large, housing over 100 workers and being maintained over a period of three years. The camp was on level ground below the road on the right-hand side, and included the Main Roads Commission site office, a tool shed and a telephone. Three large ship's water tanks now mark the location of this campsite. These tanks stored water for the camp, being fed by a nearby creek. Water was transported to fill the tanks in dry weather.

Sand was dug from the creek bed near No. 1 Camp for the hundreds of concrete pipes forming most of the culverts under the road. The eucalypt forest and then the rainforest, marked on Main Roads working drawings as "vine scrub" or "jungle", had to be manually cleared. Initially, the only mechanical aids were a few trucks, two tractors and two air compressors, with cuttings being blasted through the granite with gelignite and most work being done with picks and shovels. After the trees were cleared, horse-drawn ploughs broke up the softer earth, while horse-drawn scoops, wheelbarrows or mining trolleys on portable lengths of track removed the overburden. "Tumbling tommies", small scoops that were towed behind the crawler tractors, were used later on.

The significance of the project to Queensland's unemployment relief efforts was so great that the Queensland Governor, Sir Leslie Wilson, even visited for lunch, viewing progress on the road at No. 3 Camp, after travelling by train to Moongobulla and then up to the site.

In keeping with one of the main purposes of the road and as construction continued, a series of guesthouses and camping grounds were established along its length due to the beauty of the scenery, with Barrett's Guesthouse providing for the single male workers and visitors to the construction site.

As visitation to the Paluma Range increased, lobbying for the gazettal of a township continued, and with the head of works on the road still 2 miles (3.2 km) from Paluma, the first auctions of lots were held in December 1934. The establishment of a township at Cloudy Clearing, now known as Paluma, had begun.

The Mount Spec Tourist Road was opened by Cecil Jesson, MLA for Kennedy, on 18 July 1937, sponsored by the Townsville and District Development Association and some twelve months after the full length of the road had become trafficable by car.

The Main Roads Commission also assumed responsibility for the provision of a range of tourist facilities, and in conjunction with the construction of the Mount Spec Road, built picnic areas and shelter sheds at Little Crystal Creek, The Saddle and at the top of the range; surveyed and built a network of walking tracks, some of which formed the basis for the present National Parks track system; and constructed scenic lookouts at The Saddle, The Loop (now McClelland's Lookout in honour of the Officer-in-Charge of construction), Star Valley and Widt's Lookout. Another innovation was the establishment of a "motor camp" at Paluma in 1937, possibly the first motel in Australia, which continued to be managed by Main Roads for another twenty years.

It is clear from the available evidence that the aesthetic appeal of the road was considered by the Main Roads Commission throughout its construction. The aesthetically pleasing design of the concrete arch bridge across Little Crystal Creek constitutes the best example of this. The final design of the bridge also illustrates the long-term thinking of the local Main Roads overseer and engineers, who had successfully lobbied Main Roads' head office in Brisbane for a radical change from the more usual second-class timber bridge to a first-class concrete bridge. On 8 June 1931, the District Engineer Townsville had written to the Secretary Main Roads Commission in Brisbane that "from the aesthetic point of view a masonry arch should be considered, as it would harmonise with a rather picturesque spot." This variation was approved in January 1932 and contributed to an escalation in the final construction costs of the project. Four stonemasons were employed during the construction of the Little Crystal Creek Bridge. Wages for the stonemasons and "too much work dressing stone", as noted by the District Engineer Townsville in June 1933, contributed to the excessive cost of the bridge. However, overall approval of the final result using unskilled labour as well as that of the stonemasons is apparent in the words of the Commissioner of Main Roads, who wrote in 1933 that the bridge was "an illustration of the high quality of work which can be achieved by such labour skilfully directed." The Little Crystal Creek Bridge is reportedly the only concrete arch road bridge in Queensland that remains in service.

Other examples that illustrate the way in which the final aesthetic appeal of the road was taken into account during construction include the several smaller concrete arch culverts that still exist along the full length of the road, which are similar in construction to the bridge over Little Crystal Creek, and the sections of stone battering and stone-paved gutters that have survived despite subsequent road improvements and maintenance and natural weathering.

== Description ==
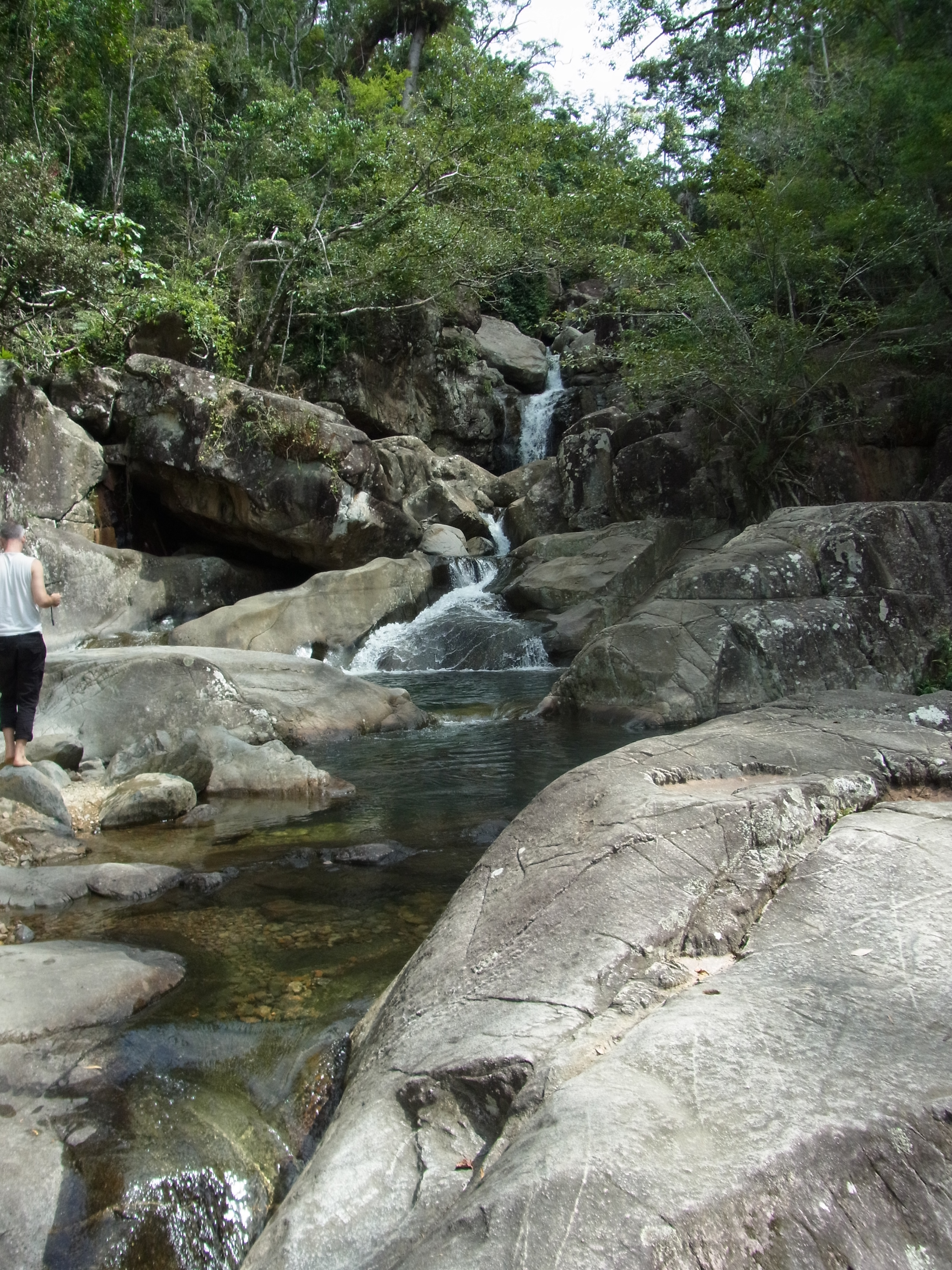
Falls above the bridge.

The Mount Spec Road, Crystal Creek stretches approximately 18 kilometres (11 mi) from its junction with the old Bruce Highway to the western outskirts of Paluma, north Queensland. It includes the bridge over Little Crystal Creek, which is located about halfway along the Mount Spec Road.

Although originally a gravel road, the Mount Spec Road now has a bitumen surface and rises some 885 metres (2,904 ft) up the Range. The road is two way. It has never been widened, and the original route and character of the road has been retained.

The Little Crystal Creek Bridge comprises a single span arch, constructed of concrete but faced with stone. It spans the Little Crystal Creek Gorge in Paluma Range National Park. The bridge has an aesthetically pleasing design, and is particularly photogenic, being in a very scenic location.

The original Little Crystal Creek Main Roads campsite that was used for the construction of the Bridge is now a car park developed by Queensland Parks and Wildlife in the 1990s. The car park at Little Crystal Creek is located on the left-hand side of the road for visitors to Little Crystal Creek Bridge and swimming hole, and part of this lies outside the heritage boundary, which is restricted to the road reserve. There is a large interpretive historical sign, including photographs, which was erected by Thuringowa City Council and Queensland Parks and Wildlife. Although a large part of the original dry stone wall in this location was removed during development of the car park, some sections still remain within the road reserve. Many of the stones of the wall were taken away and reused to build the walking track to Witt's Lookout at Paluma, although a pile of unused stones remain adjacent to the Witt's Lookout track.

There are several smaller concrete arch culverts, similar in construction to the bridge over Little Crystal Creek, and sections of dry stone walling (battering) and stone-paved gutters at various points along the full length of the road. The sections of stone guttering range from 10 to 140 metres (33 to 459 ft) in length and were constructed only where needed to divert run-off into pipe culverts. Most of the stone guttering occurs on the left-hand side of the road on the drive up the range, although one section of guttering survives on the outside of the slope, some 2.8 kilometres (1.7 mi) from the beginning of the road. Over 200 reinforced concrete culverts, or "pipe culverts", occur along the road.

Although it is now difficult to determine where many of the campsites used by the road workers during construction of the Mount Spec Road were situated, the location of The Saddle Campsite, some 10.3 kilometres (6.4 mi) from the beginning of the road, is marked by three ship's water tanks located within the road reserve. The tanks are about 1.2 metres (3 ft 11 in) square and about 1 metre (3 ft 3 in) deep (approximately 1000L capacity each).

There is a Main Roads Commission Benchmark tree located 265 metres (869 ft) ASL, some 4.8 kilometres (3.0 mi) from the start of the road. The tree is above the sealed road but within the road reserve, and although now dead, the blazed benchmark is very clear, and includes a broad arrow with "MR 51/2" marked on it.

At Paluma itself, some of the original white-painted round timber Main Roads guideposts still exist, for example, on the turnouts to Lennox Crescent. Although there were similar timber guideposts along the full length of the Mount Spec Road until a few years ago, most of these have been removed and replaced with modern metal/plastic guideposts. One section of timber guard rail, however, remains at a location about 16 kilometres (9.9 mi) from the beginning of the road, providing evidence of the original post and rail construction.

There are extensive views of Halifax Bay and the coastal plain as the road twists and turns up the Paluma Range.

== Heritage listing ==
Mount Spec Road and Little Crystal Creek Bridge was listed on the Queensland Heritage Register on 30 October 2008 having satisfied the following criteria.

The place is important in demonstrating the evolution or pattern of Queensland's history.

Mount Spec Road, which stretches approximately 18 kilometres (11 mi) from its junction with the old Bruce Highway to the western outskirts of Paluma and includes the concrete arch bridge over Little Crystal Creek, is important in demonstrating the evolution and pattern of North Queensland's history. The road was constructed between 1930 and 1936 and before the northern highway from Townsville to Ingham, at a time when Main Roads were still a new concept. It was constructed at the height of the Great Depression, using mostly unskilled labour and with the application of Unemployment Relief Scheme funds. Construction of Mount Spec Road was the largest Unemployment Relief project in the region. It was a difficult and ambitious project that eventually took six years to complete and is significant as a long-term regional project employing hundreds of men.

The place is also important in demonstrating transport and communication patterns in North Queensland, and in particular the opening up of the Paluma Range to tourists, tin miners, timber cutters and farmers. The place is one of Queensland's earliest declared Tourist Roads, a new category of Main Road established under 1929–1930 amendments to the Main Roads Act 1920, and constructed under the auspices of the newly formed Main Roads Commission, whose responsibility was to guide the planning and construction of roads in Queensland.

The place demonstrates rare, uncommon or endangered aspects of Queensland's cultural heritage.

Mount Spec Road remains substantially intact throughout the 18 kilometres (11 mi) of its length and demonstrates an extensive and now uncommon use of concrete arch culverts, dry stone walling and stone-paved gutters.

The Little Crystal Creek Bridge on Mount Spec Road is the only identified Main Roads concrete arch bridge dressed with stone remaining in service in Queensland.

The place is important in demonstrating the principal characteristics of a particular class of cultural places.

Mount Spec Road is important in demonstrating the principal characteristics of an early declared Tourist Road designed to open scenic locations to tourist traffic and constructed in hilly terrain by a large depression-era labour force using limited mechanical assistance. These characteristics include the extensive use of concrete arch culverts, dry stone walling and stone-paved gutters; the inclusion of a substantial concrete arch bridge over Little Crystal Creek rather than a less substantial timber structure; and the facing of the bridge and the arch culverts with stone.

The place is important because of its aesthetic significance.

The concrete arch bridge over Little Crystal Creek is an aesthetically pleasing design along the Mount Spec Road. The bridge spans the Little Crystal Creek gorge in the Paluma Range National Park, and has become representative of this part of the landscape, being a prominent feature commonly photographed by locals and visitors. The aesthetics of the stone-faced concrete bridge are repeated in the several smaller concrete arch culverts that are located along the full length of the road. The road has views of Halifax Bay and the coastal plain.
