= Herbert River Express =

Former newspaper in Queensland, Australia

- Founded: 1896-1897
- Ceased publication: June 2020
- Headquarters: Ingham, Queensland

The Herbert River Express was a newspaper published in Ingham, Queensland, Australia. It was distributed from Cardwell and Kennedy in the north down to Rollingstone and Toomulla in the south.

== History ==
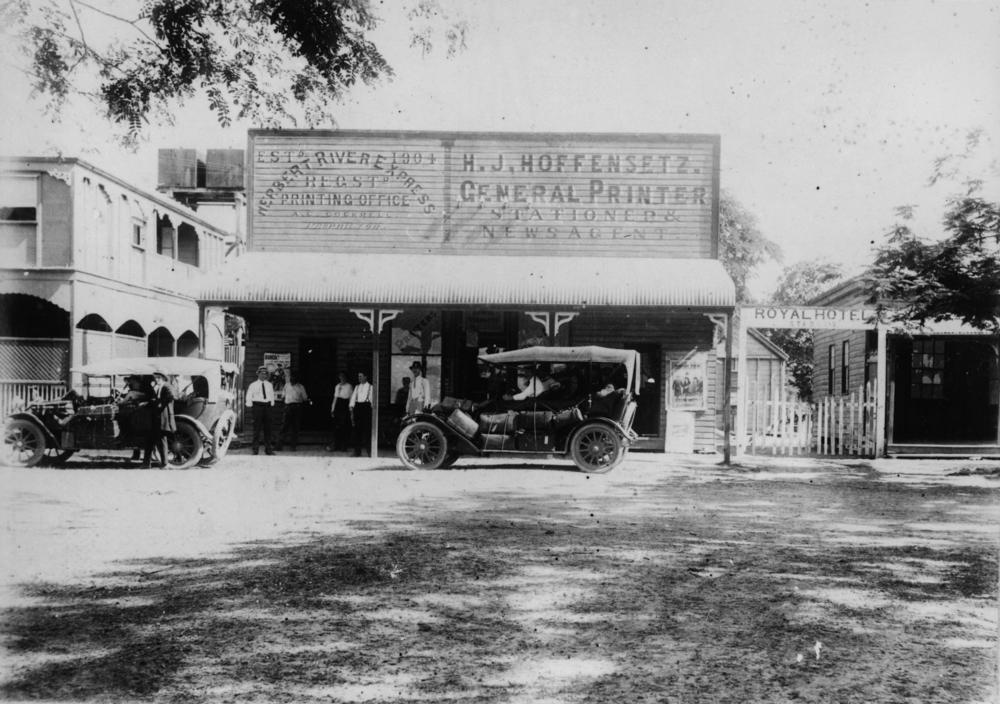
Herbert River Express office, Ingham, c. 1919

The newspaper was first published in Townsville as The Northern Age about 1896–1897. It moved to Ingham, then Halifax, under other titles such as The Planter and Northern Planter.

In 1904, it returned to Ingham as the Herbert River Express.

Along with a number of other regional Australian newspapers owned by NewsCorp, the newspaper ceased publication in June 2020.

== Notable staff ==
- David Crisafulli, journalist
