= La Paloma (disambiguation) =

"La Paloma" is a song by Sebastián Iradier.

La Paloma may also refer to:

== Places ==
- La Paloma, Paraguay, a town
- La Paloma, Texas, United States, a census-designated place
- La Paloma, Durazno, Uruguay, a village
- La Paloma, Montevideo, Uruguay, a barrio (neighborhood)
- La Paloma, Rocha, Uruguay, a small city
- La Paloma Glacier, a glacier northeast of Santiago, Chile
- La Paloma Lake, an artificial lake southeast of Ovalle, Chile

== Other uses ==
- La paloma, a moth found in Colombia
- La Paloma (film), a 1959 West German film
- La Paloma (painting), a 1904 painting by Isidre Nonell
- La Paloma (TV series), a 1995 Mexican telenovela
- La Paloma Theater, a movie theater in Encinitas, California, U.S.

== See also ==
- La Paloma-Lost Creek, Texas, U.S., a census-designated place
- Paloma (disambiguation)
