= Crystal Creek (Mutarnee) =

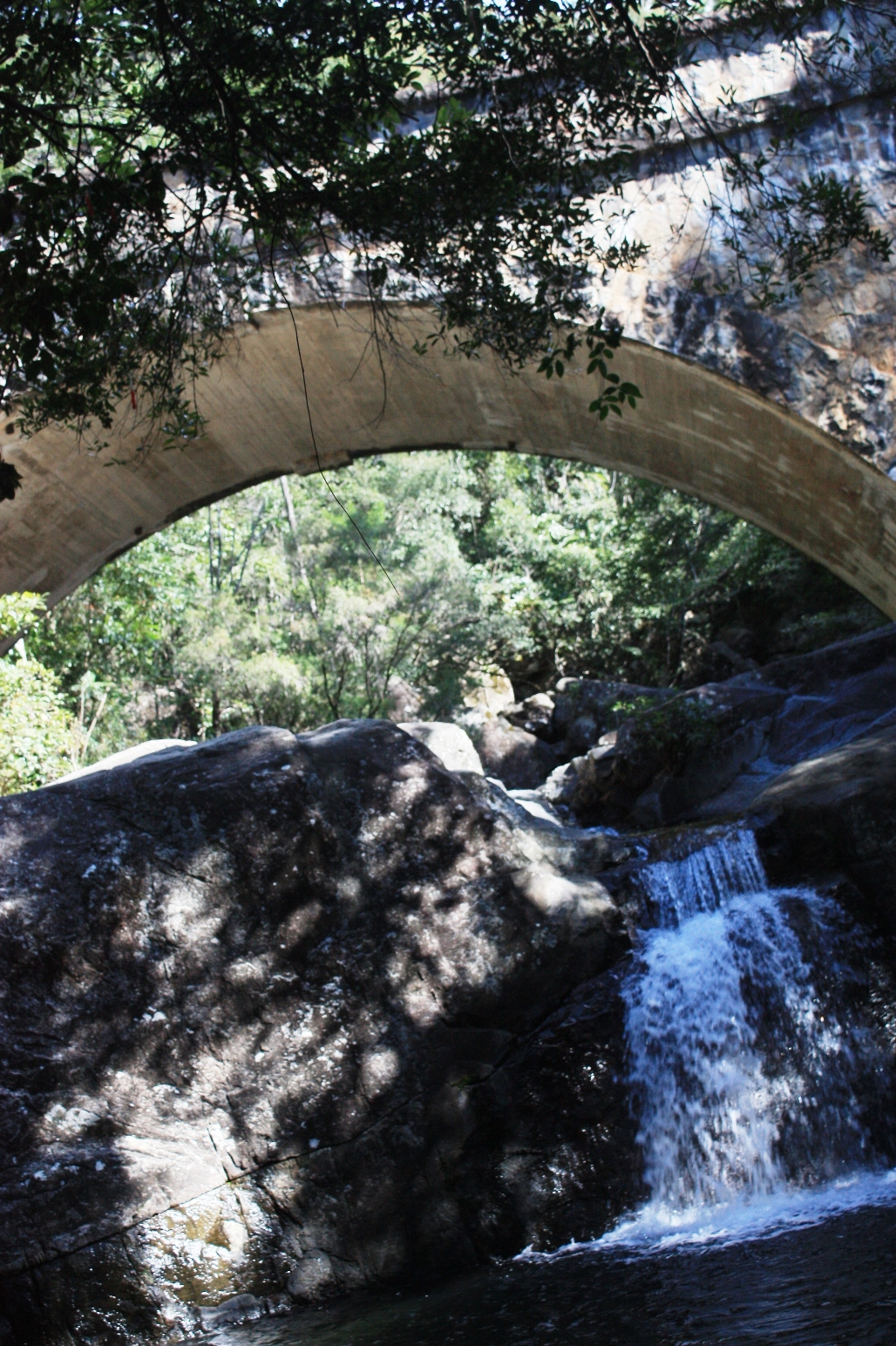
- Little Crystal Creek

Location
- Country: Australia

Physical characteristics
- Source
  - location: Paluma Dam
  - elevation: ~ 192 m (630 ft)
- Mouth
  - location: Pacific Ocean
  - coordinates: 18.92861°S 146.32361°E
- Length: 17.5 km (10.9 mi)

Crystal Creek (also known as Saltwater Creek) is a creek in the City of Townsville, Queensland, Australia. It runs for 17.5 km, beginning just below Paluma, flowing through the township of Mutarnee and emptying into the Coral Sea. It forms part of the Paluma Range National Park and is known for its division into two tourist destinations, namely Little Crystal Creek and Big Crystal Creek.

Little Crystal Creek is situated approximately two thirds of the way along Mt Spec Road, heading towards the village of Paluma. This location consists of a number of small swimming holes and waterfalls, as well as the Little Crystal Creek Bridge, an historical arch bridge of which construction began in 1932. Facilities here include a wheelchair accessible picnic area, barbecues and toilets.

Big Crystal Creek is located a few kilometres downstream from Little Crystal Creek, at the end of Spiegelhauer Road. Facilities at Big Crystal Creek also include a wheelchair accessible picnic area, barbecues, toilets, as well as a designated camping ground. The most popular of the swimming holes at Big Crystal Creek is Paradise Waterhole, which is substantially larger than that of the Little Crystal Creek waterholes, and can be accessed by a short walk from the picnic area along a bush track. Further down the road from the picnic area, the Big Crystal Creek Rockslides can be found, which is another swimming destination known for its natural waterslide formed by mossy rocks.

== Heritage listings ==
Crystal Creek has a number of heritage-listed sites, including:

- Mount Spec Road and Little Crystal Creek Bridge, Mount Spec Road (19.0°S 146.2505°E)

== See also ==
- List of rivers of Australia § Queensland
