= Toomulla, Queensland =

Toomulla
- Town
- Interactive map of Toomulla
- Coordinates: 19.08°S 146.4747°E
- Country: Australia
- State: Queensland
- City: Townsville
- LGA: City of Townsville
- Location: 11.5 km (7.1 mi) SE of Rollingstone; 31.8 km (19.8 mi) NW of Deeragun; 46.8 km (29.1 mi) NW of Townsville CBD; 1,399 km (869 mi) NNW of Brisbane

Government
  - State electorate: Hinchinbrook
  - Federal division: Herbert

Area
  - Total: 2.7 km^{2} (1.0 sq mi)

Population
  - Total: 193 (2021 census)
  - Density: 71.5/km^{2} (185/sq mi)
- Time zone: UTC+10:00 (AEST)
- Postcode: 4816
Localities around Toomulla
Clemant	Coral Sea	Coral Sea
Clemant	Toomulla	Clemant
Clemant	Clemant	Clemant

Toomulla is a coastal town and suburb in the City of Townsville, Queensland, Australia. In the 2021 census, the suburb of Toomulla had a population of 193 people.

== Geography ==
Toomulla is approximately 47 kilometres (29 mi) north-east of Townsville, Queensland, Australia.

Located 2 kilometres (1.2 mi) north of the Bruce Highway, Toomulla is considerably more isolated than that of its surrounding beachside suburbs of Balgal Beach to the north and Toolakea to the south.

== History ==
The town was named in 1956. The name Toomulla is an Aboriginal word from the Belyando River district meaning throwing stick.

== Demographics ==
In the 2006 census, the suburb of Toomulla had a population of 141 people.

In the 2016 census, the suburb of Toomulla had a population of 183 people.

In the 2021 census, the suburb of Toomulla had a population of 193 people.

== Education ==
There are no schools in Toomulla. The nearest government primary school is Rollingstone State School in Rollingstone to the north-west. The nearest government secondary school is Northern Beaches State High School in Deeragun to the south-east.

== Amenities ==
Toomulla is a popular fishing and birdwatching destination, and its facilities include designated camping areas.

There is a boat ramp in Herald Street providing access to Saltwater Creek (19.0835°S 146.4766°E). It is managed by the Townsville City Council.
