= Clemant, Queensland =

Clemant
- Suburb
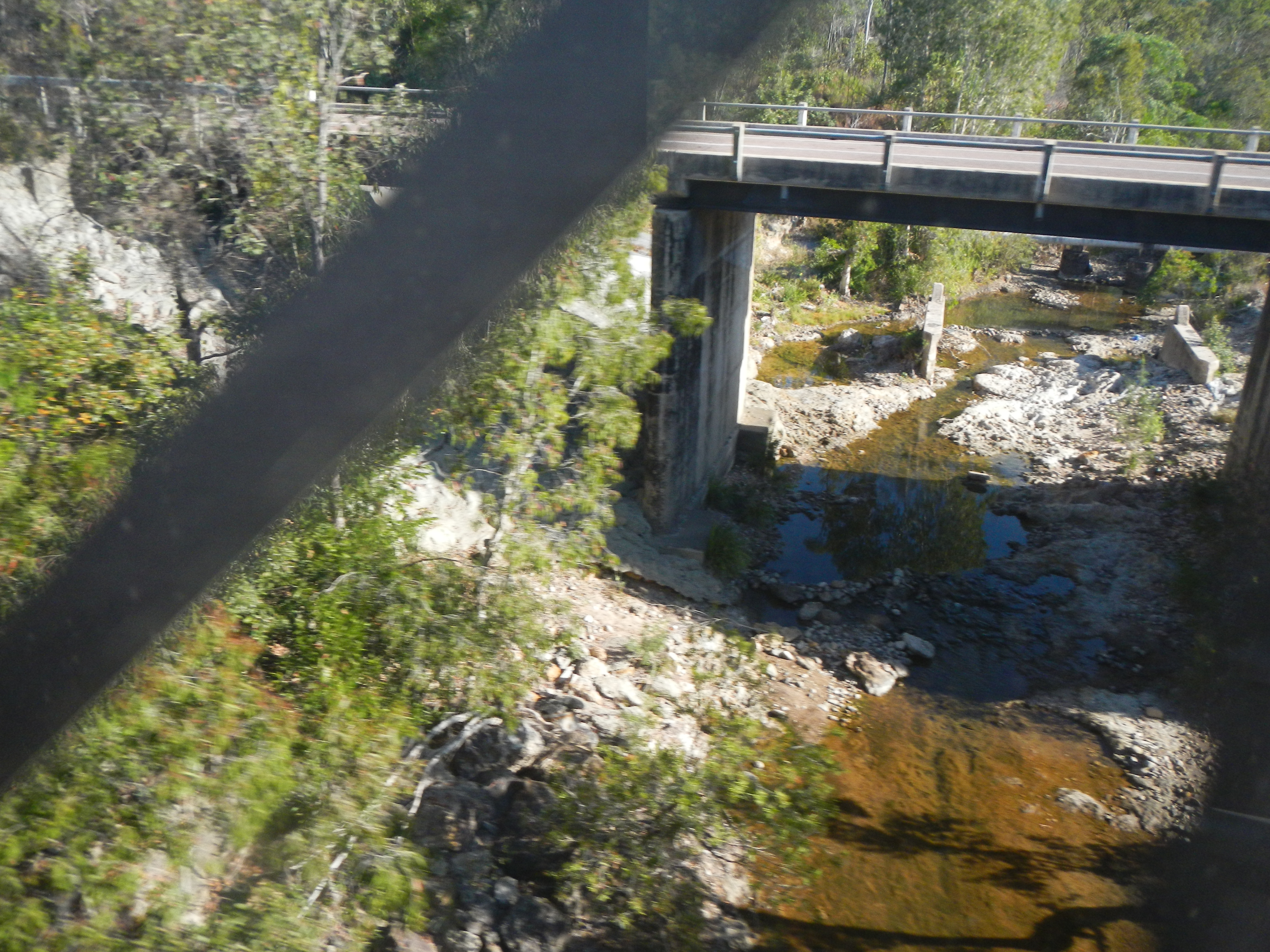
- Looking from the North Coast railway bridge towards the Bruce Highway road bridge over Saltwater Creek

- Interactive map of Clemant
- Coordinates: 19.1191°S 146.4325°E
- Country: Australia
- State: Queensland
- LGA: City of Townsville
- Location: 29.2 km (18.1 mi) NW of Deeragun; 44.2 km (27.5 mi) NW of Townsville CBD; 1,397 km (868 mi) NNW of Brisbane

Government
  - State electorate: Hinchinbrook
  - Federal division: Kennedy

Area
  - Total: 114.6 km^{2} (44.2 sq mi)

Population
  - Total: 0 (2021 census)
  - Density: 0.000/km^{2} (0.000/sq mi)
- Time zone: UTC+10:00 (AEST)
- Postcode: 4816
Suburbs around Clemant
Rollingstone	Balgal Beach; Coral Sea	Toomulla; Coral Sea
Crystal Creek	Clemant	Bluewater
Paluma	Lynam	Bluewater Park

Clemant is a rural coastal locality in the City of Townsville, Queensland, Australia. In the 2021 census, Clemant had "no people or a very low population".

== Geography ==
The Coral Sea forms most of the north-eastern boundary, but is interrupted by the locality of Toomulla.

The Bruce Highway enters the locality from the south-east (Bluewater) and exits to the north-west (Rollingstone).

The North Coast railway line also enters the locality from the south-east (Bluewater) and exits to the north-west (Rollingsone).

There are two sections of the Paluma Range National Park in the locality, one section in the north-east and another in the south-west. Between these two sections is the Clemant State Forest and, to the south, part of the Clemant Park pastoral property which is used for grazing on native vegetation.

== History ==
The locality was named and bounded on 27 July 1991.

== Demographics ==
In the 2016 census, Clemant had "no people or a very low population".

In the 2021 census, Clemant had "no people or a very low population".

== Education ==
There are no schools in Clemant. The nearest government primary schools are Rollingstone State School in neighbouring Rollingstone to the north-west and Bluewater State School in neighbouring Bluewater to the east. The nearest government secondary school is Northern Beaches State High School in Deeragun in Townsville.
