= Poloma (disambiguation) =

Poloma is a village and municipality in Slovakia.

Poloma may also refer to:

- Margaret Poloma (born 1943), American sociologist, professor, and author
- Poloma (moth), a genus of moths in the family Eupterotidae

== See also ==
- Paloma (disambiguation)
