= Rhomboda polygonoides =

Velvet jewel orchid

Conservation status
- Vulnerable (EPBC Act)

Scientific classification
- Kingdom: Plantae
- Clade: Tracheophytes
- Clade: Angiosperms
- Clade: Monocots
- Order: Asparagales
- Family: Orchidaceae
- Subfamily: Orchidoideae
- Tribe: Cranichideae
- Subtribe: Goodyerinae
- Genus: Rhomboda
- Species: R. polygonoides

Binomial name
- Rhomboda polygonoides (F.Muell.) Ormerod

Synonyms
- Epipactis polygonoides (F.Muell.) A.A.Eaton; Goodyera polygonoides F.Muell.; Hetaeria polygonoides (F.Muell.) Dockrill; Orchiodes polygonoides (F.Muell.) Kuntze; Zeuxine polygonoides (F.Muell.) P.J.Cribb; Hetaeria falcatula J.J.Sm.; Hetaeria gautierensis J.J.Sm.; Hetaeria torricellensis (Schltr.) J.J.Sm.; Zeuxine dipera Schltr.; Zeuxine dipera var. laxa Schltr.; Zeuxine falcatula (J.J.Sm.) Schltr.; Zeuxine torricellensis Schltr.

Species of orchid

Rhomboda polygonoides , commonly known as the velvet jewel orchid, is a species of terrestrial orchid that is native to New Guinea, New Caledonia, the Solomon Islands and north-eastern Queensland. It has between five and nine narrow egg-shaped, purplish green leaves with a central white stripe and up to fourteen green and white resupinate flowers with the lateral sepals held nearly horizontally.

== Description ==
Rhomboda polygonoides is a terrestrial, tuberous, perennial herb with between five and nine purplish green to bronze coloured, narrow egg-shaped leaves with a broad central white stripe. The leaves are scattered along the flowering stem and are 50–80 mm (2–3 in) long and 15–22 mm (0.6–0.9 in) wide. Between five and fourteen resupinate, green and white flowers, 5–6 mm (0.20–0.24 in) long and 6–7 mm (0.2–0.3 in) wide are borne on a more or less hairy flowering stem 100–300 mm (4–10 in) tall. The dorsal sepal is broadly egg-shaped, about 4.5 mm (0.2 in) long, 3 mm (0.1 in) wide and is fused to the petals forming a hood over the column. The lateral sepals are green, about 5 mm (0.2 in) long, 3 mm (0.1 in) wide, held almost horizontally and spread widely apart from each other. The petals are translucent white,4.5 mm (0.2 in) long and about 1.3 mm (0.05 in) wide. The labellum is about 5 mm (0.2 in) long, 2 mm (0.08 in) wide with inrolled edges, a narrow central region and a deep pouch at its base. Flowering occurs from June to August in Australia but over a longer period in New Guinea.

== Taxonomy and naming ==
The velvet jewel orchid was first formally described in 1873 by Ferdinand von Mueller who gave it the name Goodyera polygonoides from a specimen collected near Rockingham Bay. The description was published in Fragmenta phytographiae Australiae. In 1995, Paul Ormerod changed the name to Rhomboda polygonoides. The specific epithet (polygonoides) refers to a perceived similarity of this species to a plant in the genus Polygonum. The suffix -oides is a Latin ending meaning "likeness".

== Distribution and habitat ==
In Australia the orchid has been recorded from three tropical rainforest locations in north-east Queensland between the Paluma Range and the Daintree River, at altitudes of 450 to 600 m above sea level, growing on the forest floor. It occurs within the Wet Tropics of Queensland Natural Resource Management Region. Plants have been collected in notophyll vine forest, on the tops of granite boulders, flat rocks and the rotting wood of fallen trees.

== Conservation ==
The orchid is listed as "vulnerable" under the Australian Government Environment Protection and Biodiversity Conservation Act 1999 and the Queensland Nature Conservation (Wildlife) Regulation 2006. All known populations lie within protected areas. Potentially, the main threats to the orchid in Australia are illegal over-collection by orchid enthusiasts, and from feral pigs.
