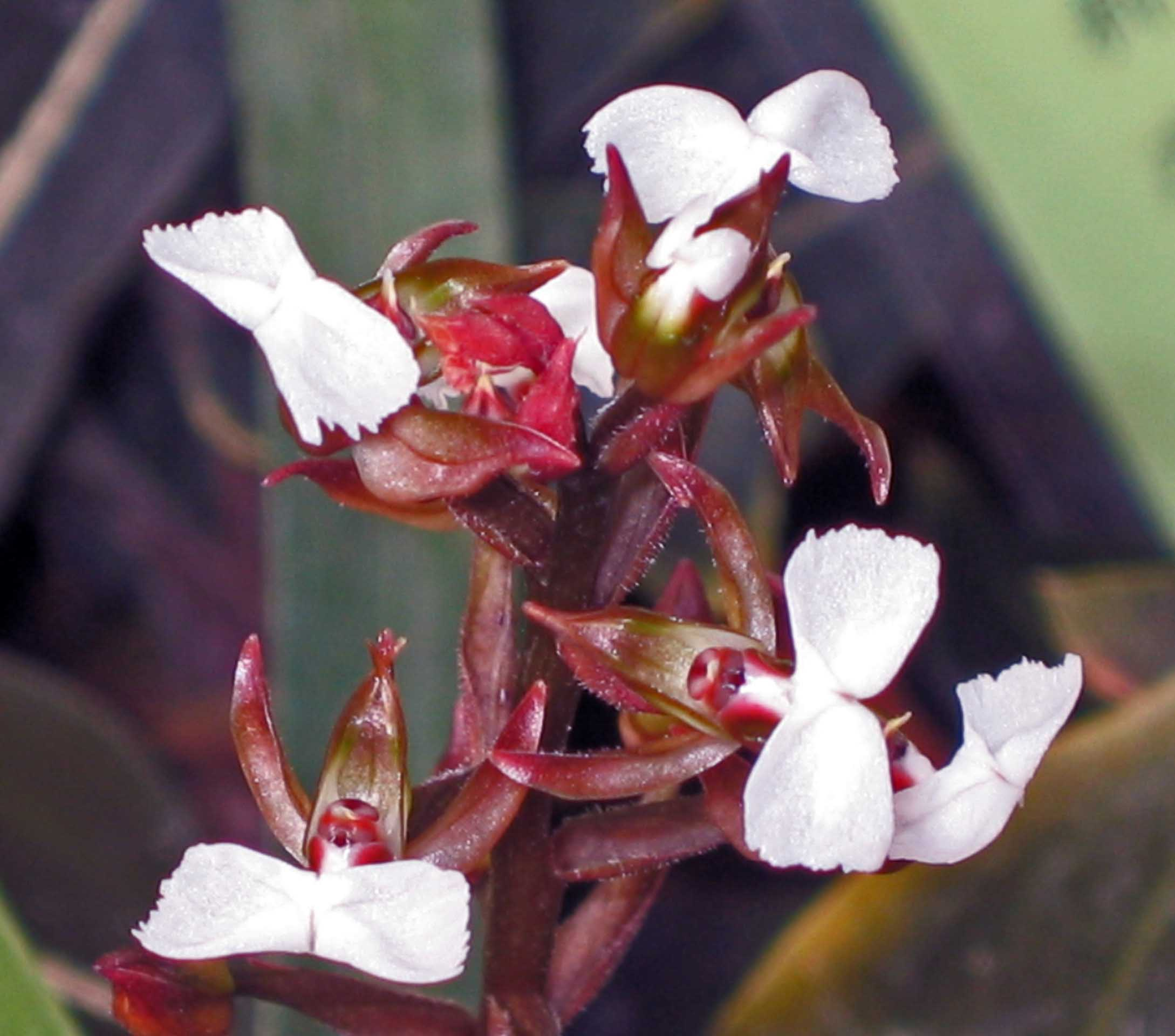
- Rhomboda moulmeinensis

Scientific classification
- Kingdom: Plantae
- Clade: Embryophytes
- Clade: Tracheophytes
- Clade: Spermatophytes
- Clade: Angiosperms
- Clade: Monocots
- Order: Asparagales
- Family: Orchidaceae
- Subfamily: Orchidoideae
- Tribe: Cranichideae
- Subtribe: Goodyerinae
- Genus: Rhomboda; Lindl.

Type species
- Rhomboda longifolia

= Rhomboda =

Genus of flowering plants

Rhomboda, commonly known as velvet jewel orchids, is a genus of about twenty species of flowering plants in the orchid family Orchidaceae. Plants in this genus are mostly terrestrial herbs with a fleshy, creeping rhizome and a loose rosette of green to maroon coloured leaves. Small resupinate or partly resupinate, dull coloured flowers are borne on a hairy flowering stem. The dorsal sepal and petals overlap and form a hood over the column and there is a deep pouch at the base of the labellum. They are found in tropical regions from northern India through Southeast Asia, China, Japan to Australia and some Pacific Islands.

== Description ==
Orchids in the genus Rhomboda are usually terrestrial, perennial, deciduous, sympodial herbs with a creeping, fleshy, above-ground rhizome anchored to the ground by wiry roots. A few species are epiphytic. The leaves are spirally arranged around the stem with the upper leaves forming a loose rosette. They are dark green to maroon or brownish with a central white or red line. The flowers are resupinate or partly resupinate with the dorsal sepal and petals fused to form a hood over the column. The lateral sepals are similar to the dorsal sepal, free and often spreading. The labellum has a deep pouch near its base, a narrow middle section and often has a hooked tip.

== Taxonomy and naming ==
The genus Rhomboda was first formally described in 1857 by John Lindley and the description was published in Journal of the Linnean Society, Botany. The name Rhomboda is derived from the Ancient Greek word rhombos meaning "a top", referring to the shape of the calli on the labellum of the type specimen.

== Distribution ==
Orchids in the genus Rhomboda are native to Nepal, India, Sri Lanka, Bhutan, China, Myanmar, Thailand, Laos, Cambodia, Vietnam, Japan, the Philippines, New Guinea, New Caledonia, the Solomon Islands, Vanuatu and Queensland between the Daintree and Paluma.

=== Species list ===
The following is a list of species accepted by the World Checklist of Selected Plant Families as at August 2018:

- Rhomboda abbreviata (Lindl.) Ormerod - Guangdong, Guangxi, Guizhou, Hainan, Assam, Myanmar, Nepal, Thailand
- Rhomboda alticola (Schltr.) Ormerod - New Guinea
- Rhomboda arunachalensis A.N.Rao - Arunachal Pradesh
- Rhomboda atrorubens (Schltr.) Ormerod - New Guinea, Bismarck Archipelago
- Rhomboda bantaengensis (J.J.Sm.) Ormerod - Sulawesi
- Rhomboda blackii (Ames) Ormerod - Mindanao
- Rhomboda cristata (Blume) Ormerod - Java, Philippines
- Rhomboda dennisii Ormerod - Vanuatu, Solomon Islands
- Rhomboda elbertii Ormerod - Sulawesi
- Rhomboda fanjingensis Ormerod - Guizhou
- Rhomboda kerintjiensis (J.J.Sm.) Ormerod - Sumatra
- Rhomboda lanceolata (Lindl.) Ormerod - Darjiling, Bhutan, Assam, Arunachal Pradesh, Myanmar, Vietnam, Peninsular Malaysia, Philippines, Sulawesi, Sumatra, New Guinea, Kyushu
- Rhomboda longifolia Lindl. - Sikkim
- Rhomboda minahassae (Schltr.) Ormerod - Sulawesi
- Rhomboda moulmeinensis (C.S.P.Parish & Rchb.f.) Ormerod - Guangxi, Guizhou, Sichuan, Tibet, Yunnan, Myanmar, Thailand
- Rhomboda pauciflora (Ridl.) Ormerod - Vietnam, Peninsular Malaysia, Sabah
- Rhomboda petelottii (Gagnep.) Ormerod - Vietnam
- Rhomboda polygonoides (F.Muell.) Ormerod - Queensland, New Guinea, Maluku, Solomon Islands, Bismarck Archipelago, New Caledonia
- Rhomboda pulchra (King & Pantl.) Ormerod & Av.Bhattacharjee
- Rhomboda tokioi (Fukuy.) Ormerod - Guangdong, Taiwan, Japan, Ryukyu Islands, Vietnam
- Rhomboda velutina (J.J.Sm.) Ormerod - Java, Lesser Sunda Islands
- Rhomboda wardii Ormerod - Myanmar
- Rhomboda yakusimensis (Masam.) Ormerod - Ryukyu Islands, Izu Islands, Kyushu
