= Coolbie =

- Suburb
- Interactive map of Coolbie
- Coordinates: 18.9055°S 146.2677°E
- Country: Australia
- State: Queensland
- LGA: Shire of Hinchinbrook
- Location: 36.8 km (22.9 mi) SSE of Ingham; 74.7 km (46.4 mi) NW of Townsville; 1,433 km (890 mi) NNW of Brisbane

Government
  - State electorate: Hinchinbrook
  - Federal division: Kennedy

Area
  - Total: 88.8 km^{2} (34.3 sq mi)

Population
  - Total: 110 (2021 census)
  - Density: 1.24/km^{2} (3.21/sq mi)
- Postcode: 4850
Suburbs around Coolbie
Bambaroo	Orient	Coral Sea
Bambaroo	Coolbie	Coral Sea
Crystal Creek	Crystal Creek	Mutarnee

Coolbie is a coastal locality in the Shire of Hinchinbrook, Queensland, Australia. In the 2021 census, Coolbie had a population of 110 people.

== Demographics ==
In the 2016 census, Coolbie had a population of 104 people.

In the 2021 census, Coolbie had a population of 110 people.

== Education ==
There are no schools in Coolbie. The nearest government primary school is Mutarnee State School in neighbouring Mutarnee to the south-east. The nearest government secondary school is Ingham State High School in Ingham to the north-west.
