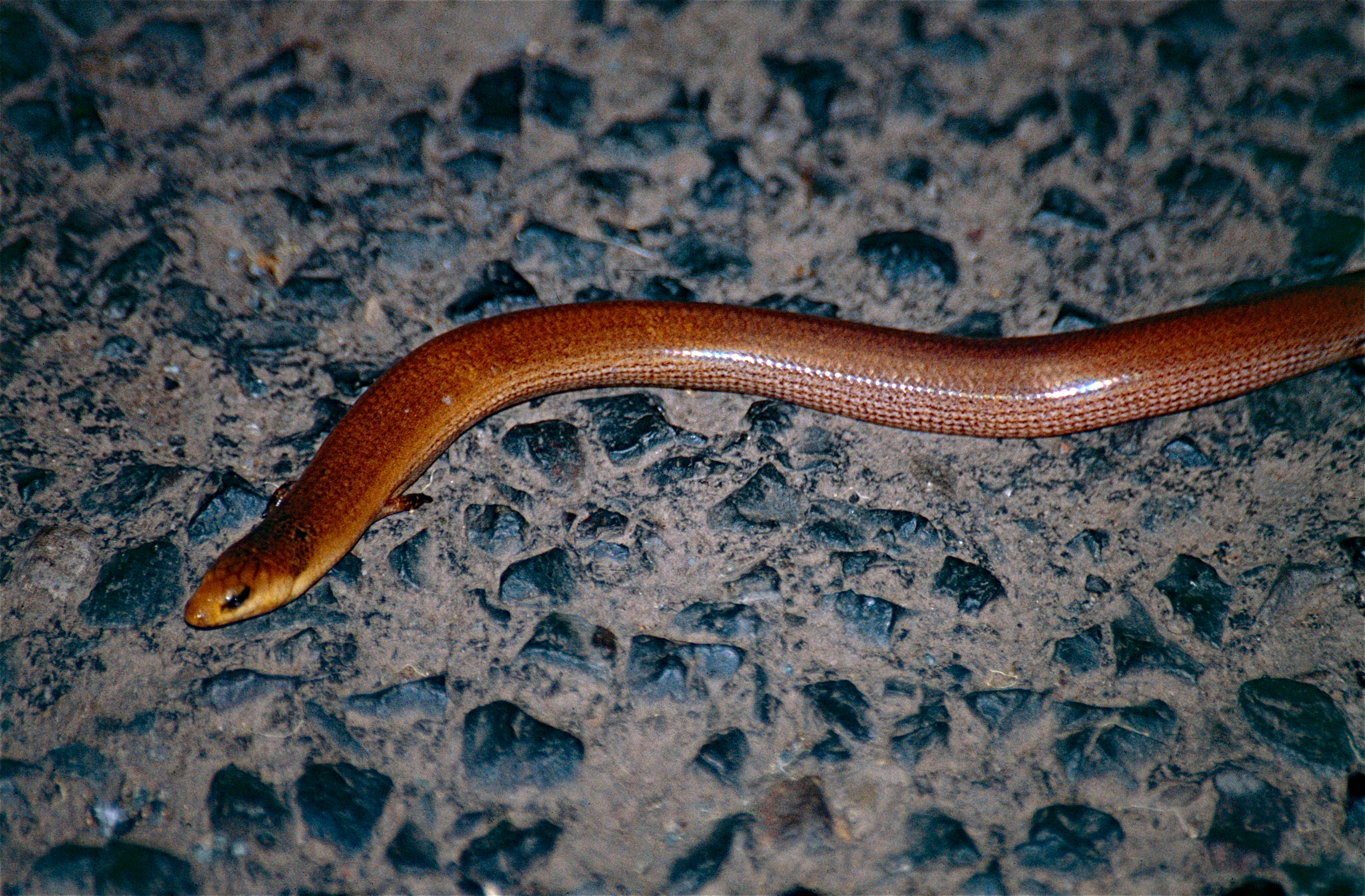
- Three-toed snake-tooth skink (Coeranoscincus reticulatus)

Scientific classification
- Kingdom: Animalia
- Phylum: Chordata
- Class: Reptilia
- Order: Squamata
- Family: Scincidae
- Subfamily: Sphenomorphinae
- Genus: Coeranoscincus; Wells & Wellington, 1983

Type species
- Ophioscincus frontalis De Vis, 1888

= Coeranoscincus =

Genus of lizards

Coeranoscincus is a genus of skinks. They are endemic to Australia and found in eastern Queensland and northeastern New South Wales.

== Species ==
There are two species:

- Coeranoscincus frontalis (De Vis, 1888) – limbless snake-tooth skink
- Coeranoscincus reticulatus (Günther, 1873) – three-toed snake-tooth skink
