= Paloma =

Paloma may refer to:

== Arts and media ==
- "Paloma", a song by Mika from My Name Is Michael Holbrook (2019)
- Paloma (film), a 2022 film by Brazilian director Marcelo Gomes
- Paloma (novel), by Kristine Kathryn Rusch
- Paloma (TV series), a 1975 Mexican TV series, or telenovela

== People ==
- Paloma (name)

== Places in the United States ==
- Paloma, California, an unincorporated community in Calaveras County, California
- Paloma, Illinois, an unincorporated community
- Paloma Elementary School District, Maricopa County, Arizona

== Other uses ==
- Hurricane Paloma, a hurricane in the 2008 Atlantic hurricane season
- Paloma (cocktail), a popular tequila-based cocktail
- Paloma (star), a binary star in the constellation Auriga
- Paloma Co., Ltd, a Japanese gas appliance manufacturer, owner of the Rheem Manufacturing Company
- USC Paloma, a football team based in Hamburg, Germany
- USS Paloma (SP-533), a yacht converted into an armed patrol boat for World War I

== See also ==
- "Cucurrucucú paloma", a song by Tomás Méndez
- La Paloma (disambiguation)
- Palomas (disambiguation)
- Paluma (disambiguation)
- Pamola, a legendary bird spirit in Abenaki mythology
