= Paloma (name) =

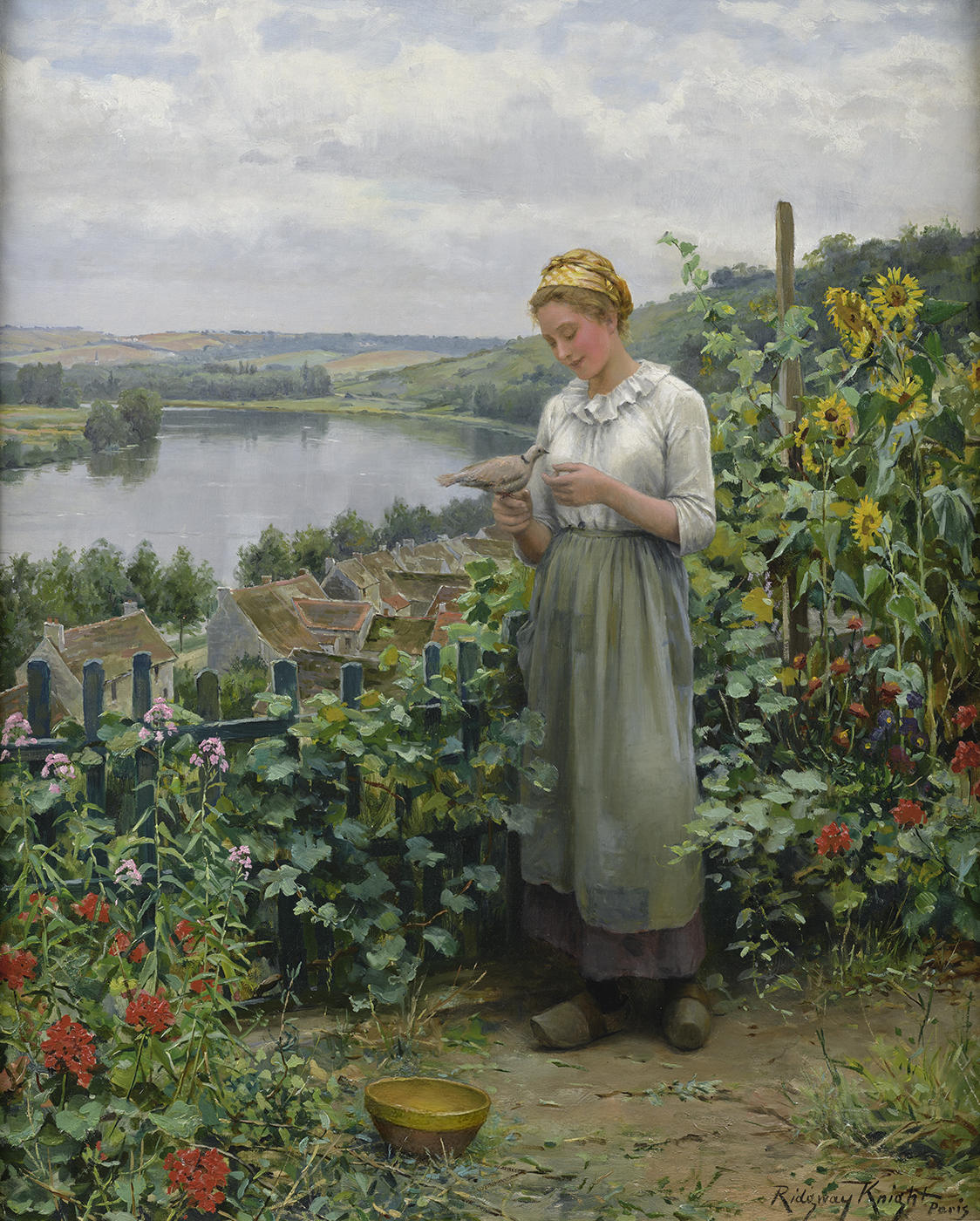
- The Pet Dove by Daniel Ridgway Knight.
- Gender: Feminine

Origin
- Origin: Spain
- Meaning: Dove; Peaceful

Paloma is a Spanish female given name, derived from Latin "palumbus", which means "dove", a symbol of peace. The name also can be understood as the Holy Spirit symbolized in this bird. Palomma, using double "m", comes from a Neapolitan dialect, made famous in the song "Palomma 'e notte" written by Di Giacomo and Buongiovanni in 1906.

In Southern Italy, "La Festa della Palomma" (Feast of Palomma) is celebrated at Easter at the Chiesa della Madonna della Nova (Our Lady of Nova's Church), Ostuni, Puglia. In Spain, the "Virgen de la Paloma de Madrid" feast day is celebrated on August 15.

Paloma is a common name in Spain.

== Notable people named Paloma ==
=== Given name ===
- Paloma Adrados (born 1957), Spanish politician
- Paloma Aguirre, American conservationist and politician
- Paloma Baeza, British actress
- Paloma Berganza, Spanish singer
- Paloma Bloyd, American actress and model
- Paloma Bustamante (born 2005), Chilean footballer
- Paloma del Río, Spanish journalist
- Paloma Efron, Argentine journalist
- Paloma Faith, British singer and actress
- Paloma García Ovejero, Spanish journalist
- Paloma Gómez Enríquez, Spanish politician
- Paloma Herrera, Argentine ballet dancer
- Paloma Kwiatkowski, Canadian actress
- Paloma McLardy, Spanish drummer
- Paloma Nunes (born 1997), Brazilian politician
- Paloma O'Shea, Spanish pianist
- Paloma Pedrero, Spanish actress
- Paloma Picasso, French and Spanish designer and businesswoman
- Paloma Pinault (born Valentina Paloma Pinault), daughter of François-Henri Pinault and Salma Hayek
- Paloma Rao, Indian actress
- Paloma San Basilio, Spanish singer
- Paloma Stoecker, British singer
- Paloma Tortajada, Spanish broadcaster and journalist
- Paloma Valencia (born 1978), Colombian politician
- Paloma Weisz, German contemporary artist
- Paloma Young, American designer
- Paloma Mami, Chilean-American singer

=== Surname ===
- Blanca Paloma (born 1989), Spanish singer, set designer and costume designer.
- Paris Paloma (born 1999), English singer-songwriter and guitarist.
- Pepsi Paloma (1966–1985), Filipino-American dancer and actress

=== Stage Name ===
- Paloma (drag queen) Drag Queen, winner of Drag Race France
