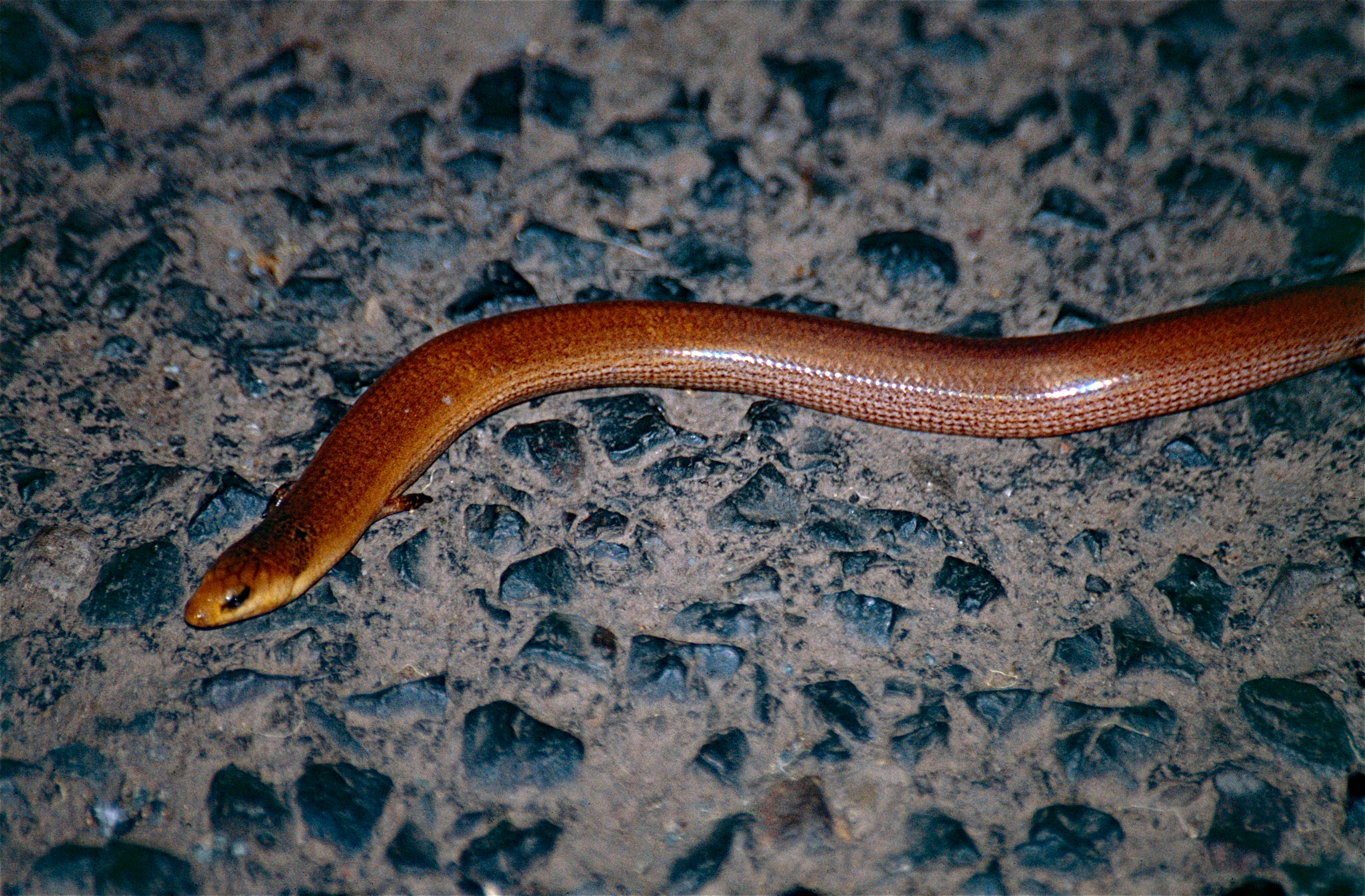

Conservation status
- Least Concern (IUCN 3.1)

Scientific classification
- Kingdom: Animalia
- Phylum: Chordata
- Class: Reptilia
- Order: Squamata
- Family: Scincidae
- Genus: Coeranoscincus
- Species: C. reticulatus

Binomial name
- Coeranoscincus reticulatus (Günther, 1873)

Synonyms
- Chelomeles reticulatus Günther, 1873; Lygosoma reticulatum (Günther, 1873); Anomalopus reticulatus (Günther, 1873); Saiphos reticulatus (Günther, 1873)

= Three-toed snake-tooth skink =

Species of reptile

The three-toed snake-tooth skink (Coeranoscincus reticulatus) is a species of skink in the family Scincidae. It is endemic to south-eastern Queensland and north-eastern New South Wales, Australia. It occurs in subtropical rainforest, wet sclerophyll forest, and montane forest on rich dark soils on the coast and adjacent ranges; some coastal/island populations (Fraser Island and Cooloola) occur on pale sands in lowlands.

Coeranoscincus reticulatus measure 67–195 mm (2.6–7.7 in) in snout–vent length. The limbs are reduced with three digits in each.

In 2016, the three-toed snake-tooth skink was added to the Australian federal government's list of threatened species.
