= Palomas =

Palomas may refer to:

== Places ==
- Palomas (Madrid), a ward of the Hortaleza district, Madrid, Spain
- Palomas, Arizona, a community in the United States
- Palomas, Badajoz, Spain, a town
- Palomas, Comerío, Puerto Rico, a barrio
- Palomas (Mexibús, Line 1), a BRT station in Ecatepec de Morelos
- Palomas (Mexibús, Line 4), a BRT station in Ecatepec de Morelos
- Las Palomas, New Mexico, a community in the United States
- Puerto Palomas, Chihuahua, Mexico, a small town also known as simply Palomas

== Other uses ==
- "La Paloma", a popular Spanish song
- Hurricane Paloma, 2008 hurricane in the Atlantic ocean
- USS Palomas (IX-91), a U.S. Navy schooner

== See also ==
- Isla de Las Palomas, a Spanish island
- Paloma (disambiguation)
