= La Paloma (painting) =

1904 painting by Isidre Nonell

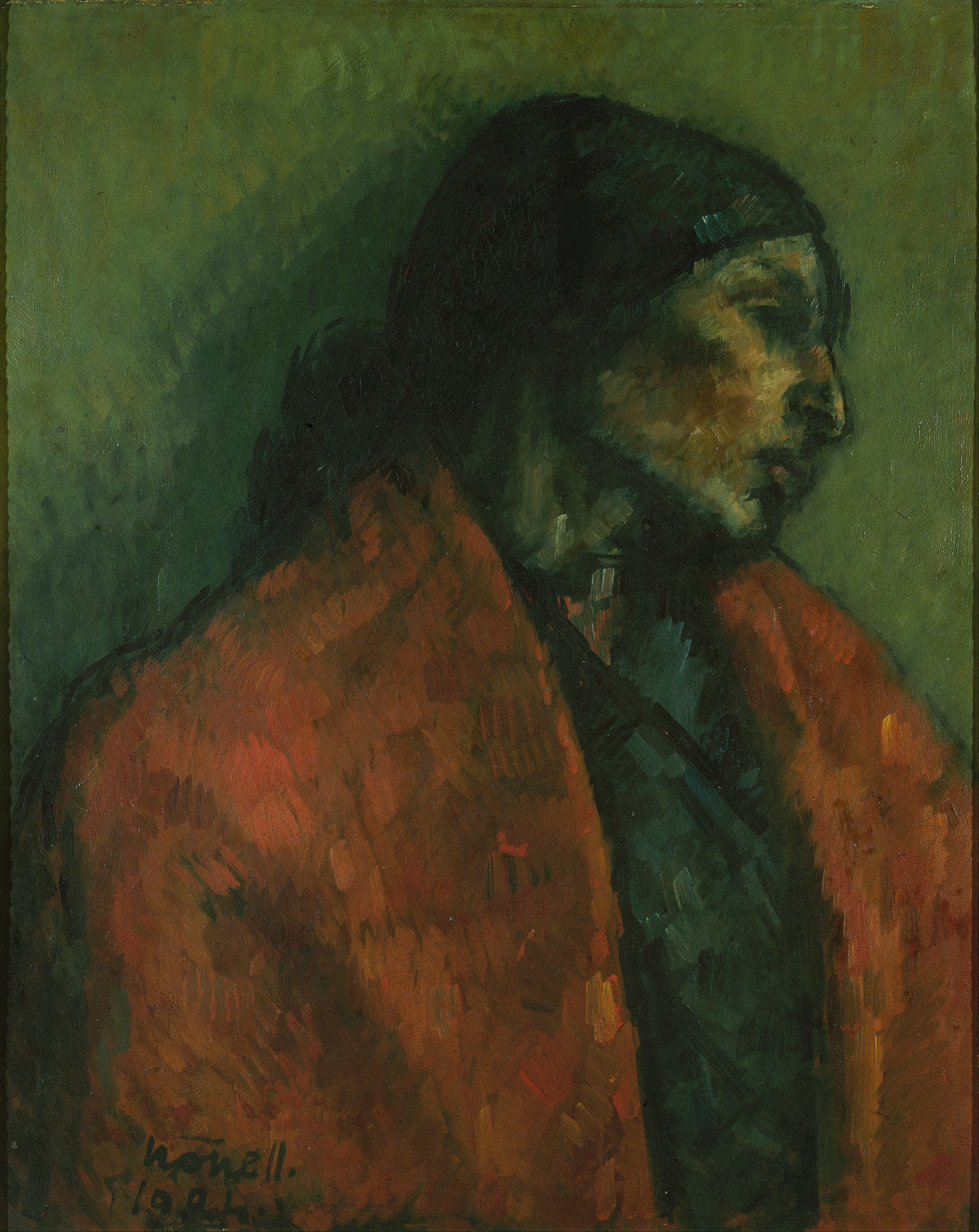
- Artist: Isidre Nonell
- Year: 1904
- Medium: Oil on canvas
- Location: Museu Nacional d'Art de Catalunya; Barcelona

La Paloma is an oil on canvas painting by Catalan painter Isidre Nonell, created in 1904, which is exhibited at the National Art Museum of Catalonia in Barcelona.

== Description ==
La Paloma, draped in burnt orange against a dark green background, faces away from the viewer as if in deep thought. In this painting, Nonell sharply accentuates her features and uses bold strokes to further define her.

== Composition ==
The portrait is placed off center and nearly fills the frame. The woman, mostly in shadow faces the muted light.
