= Coeranoscincus frontalis =

Conservation status
- Least Concern (IUCN 3.1)

Scientific classification
- Kingdom: Animalia
- Phylum: Chordata
- Class: Reptilia
- Order: Squamata
- Family: Scincidae
- Genus: Coeranoscincus
- Species: C. frontalis

Binomial name
- Coeranoscincus frontalis (De Vis, 1888)

Synonyms
- Ophioscincus frontalis De Vis, 1888; Anomalopus frontalis (De Vis, 1888); Saiphos frontalis (De Vis, 1888)

Species of lizard

Coeranoscincus frontalis, the limbless snake-tooth skink, is a species of skink. It is endemic to north-eastern Queensland, Australia. It is a large, fossorial skink that occurs in the rainforest of coastal ranges and lowlands.

Coeranoscincus frontalis measure 70–291 mm (2.8–11.5 in) in snout–vent length. There are no external traces of the limbs.
