= Mutarnee, Queensland =

Mutarnee
- Town
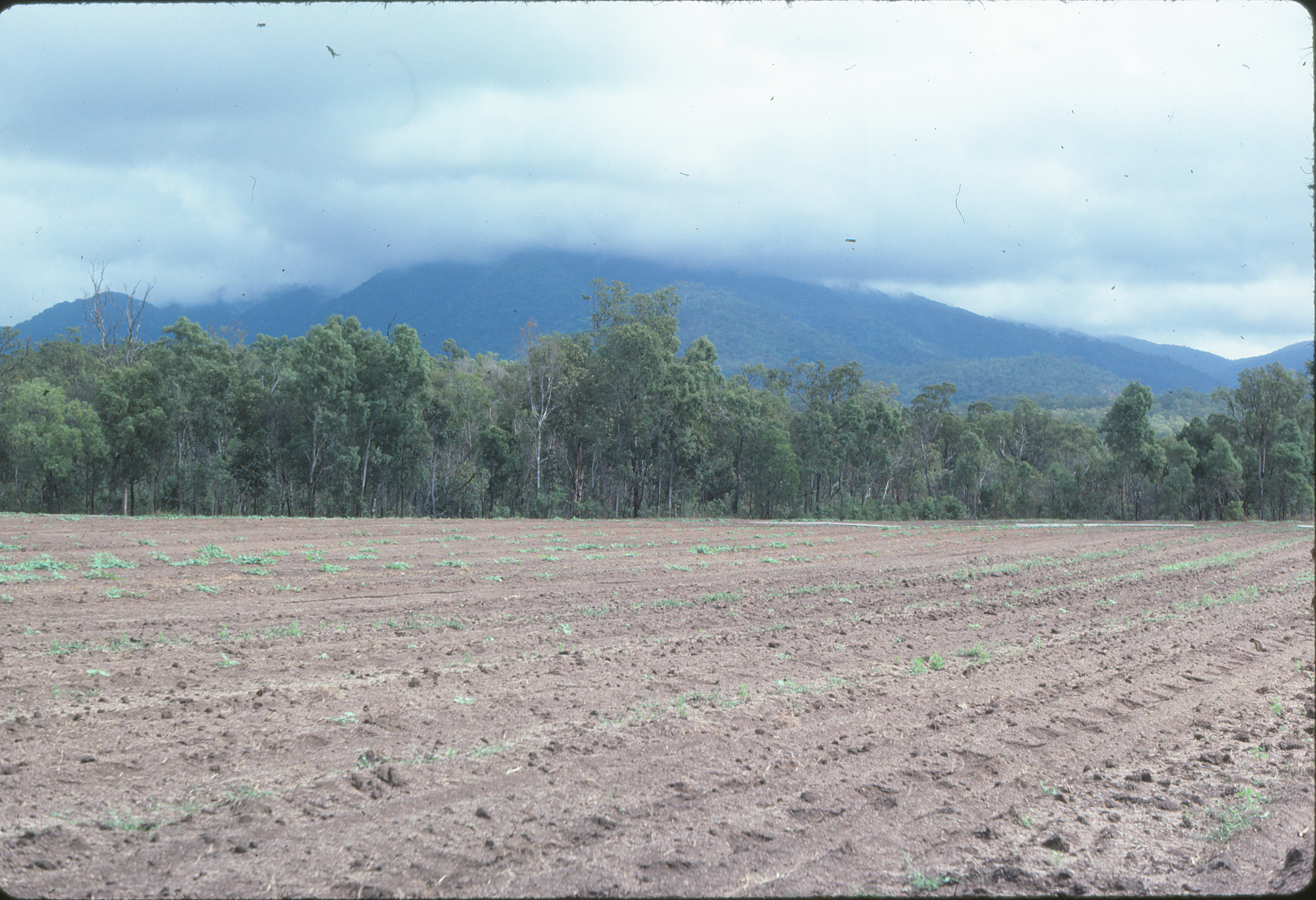
- Ploughed paddock, Mutarnee, 1984

- Interactive map of Mutarnee
- Coordinates: 18.9538°S 146.2919°E
- Country: Australia
- State: Queensland
- LGA: City of Townsville
- Location: 43.2 km (26.8 mi) SSE of Ingham; 54.9 km (34.1 mi) NW of Deeragun; 69.9 km (43.4 mi) NW of Townsville CBD; 1,431 km (889 mi) NNW of Brisbane

Government
  - State electorate: Hinchinbrook
  - Federal division: Herbert

Area
  - Total: 59.7 km^{2} (23.1 sq mi)

Population
  - Total: 120 (2021 census)
  - Density: 2.01/km^{2} (5.21/sq mi)
- Time zone: UTC+10:00 (AEST)
- Postcode: 4816
Localities around Mutarnee
Coolbie	Coolbie	Coral Sea
Crystal Creek	Mutarnee	Coral Sea
Crystal Creek	Crystal Creek	Rollingstone

Mutarnee is a rural town and coastal locality in the City of Townsville, Queensland, Australia. In the 2021 census, the locality of Mutarnee had a population of 120 people.

== Geography ==
Mutarnee is approximately 67 kilometres north-west of Townsville, Queensland, Australia and 44 kilometres south-east of Ingham. It is situated on the banks of Crystal Creek and is near the rainforest village of Paluma.

The town is in the north-west of the locality and consists of rural residential housing. The rest of the locality is used for a mix of agriculture, including growing sugarcane and grazing on native vegetation.

The Bruce Highway enters the locality from the south-east (Rollingstone), passes through the town, and exits to the north-west (Coolbie). The North Coast railway line enters the locality from the south-east (Rollingstone) and is immediately parallel and west of the highway. It passes through the town and exits to the north-west (Coolbie). There are two railway stations:

- Mutarnee railway station, serving the town (18.9499°S 146.2903°E)
- Moongobulla railway station, in the south of the locality, now abandoned (18.9781°S 146.3305°E)

== History ==
Mutarnee takes its name from its railway station, which in turn was named on 23 December 1920 by the Queensland Railways Department using an Aboriginal word meaning food, as suggested by Archibald Meston.

Ollera Provisional School opened in 1905 and closed in 1906. Ollera Creek State School opened on 17 May 1920. In 1923, it was renamed Mutarnee State School.

== Demographics ==
In the 2016 census, the locality of Mutarnee had a population of 116 people.

In the 2021 census, the locality of Mutarnee had a population of 120 people.

== Education ==
Mutarnee State School is a government primary (Prep-6) school for boys and girls at School Road (18.9550°S 146.2871°E). In 2017, the school had an enrolment of 19 students with 3 teachers (1 full-time equivalent) and 3 non-teaching staff (1 full-time equivalent).

Mungalla Silver Lining School is a private secondary school (7–12) school for Indigenous boys and girls at 64 Spiegelhauer Road (18.9685°S 146.2881°E).

There is no government secondary school is Mutarnee. The nearest government secondary schools are Ingham State High School in Ingham to the north and Northern Beaches State High School in Deeragun, Townsville, to the south-east.

== Amenities ==
Amenities at Mutarnee include a recreational waterhole and a camping area at nearby Crystal Creek.
