= Balgal Beach, Queensland =

Balgal Beach
- Suburb
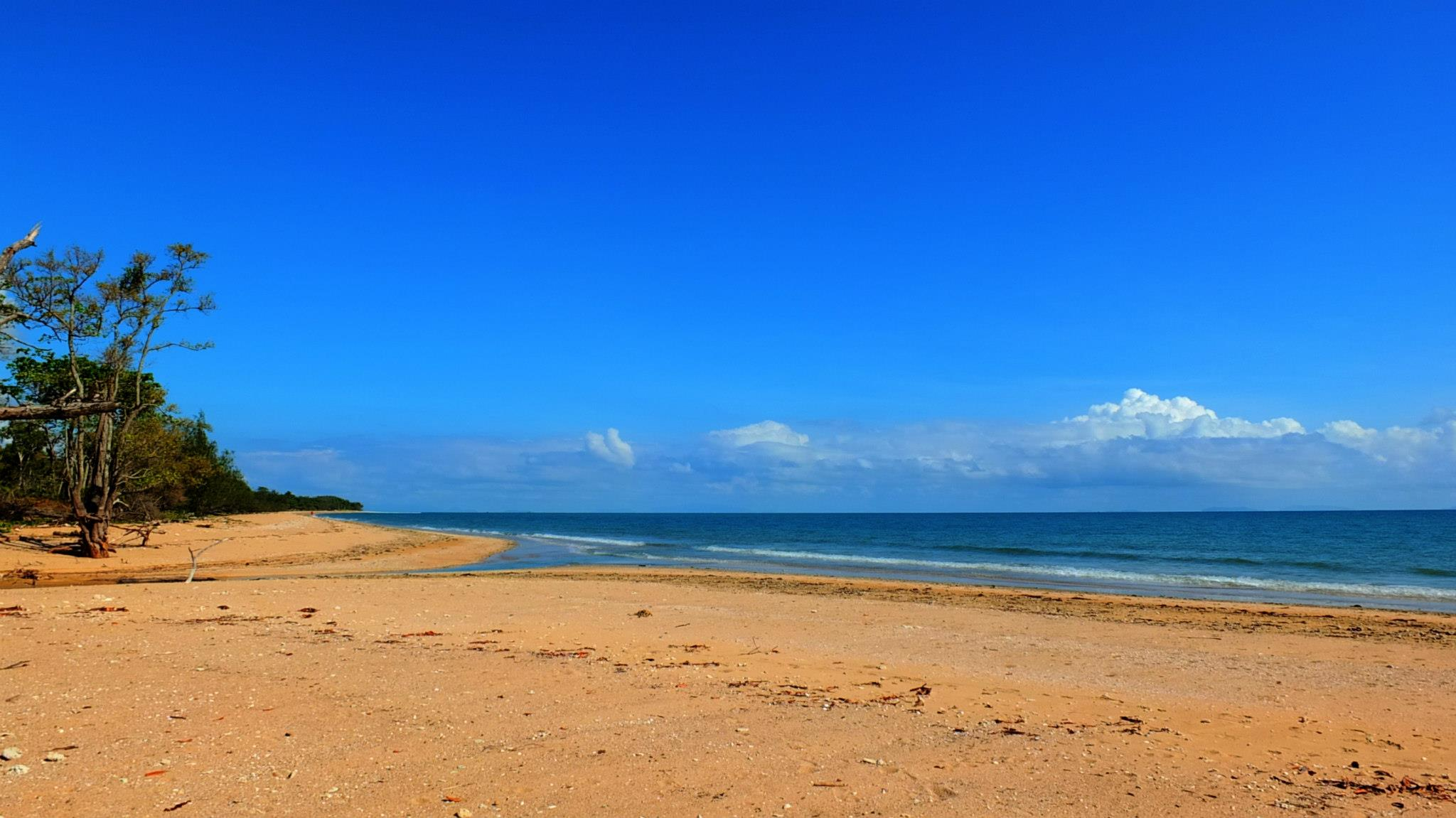
- Balgal Beach

- Interactive map of Balgal Beach
- Coordinates: 19.0438°S 146.4116°E
- Country: Australia
- State: Queensland
- City: Townsville
- LGA: City of Townsville
- Location: 42.1 km (26.2 mi) NW of Deeragun; 57.1 km (35.5 mi) NW of Townsville CBD; 1,410 km (880 mi) NNW of Brisbane

Government
  - State electorate: Hinchinbrook
  - Federal division: Kennedy

Area
  - Total: 12.6 km^{2} (4.9 sq mi)

Population
  - Total: 998 (2021 census)
  - Density: 79.2/km^{2} (205.1/sq mi)
- Time zone: UTC+10:00 (AEST)
- Postcode: 4816
Suburbs around Balgal Beach
| Rollingstone | Rollingstone | Coral Sea |
| Rollingstone | Balgal Beach | Clemant |
| Rollingstone | Clemant | Clemant |

Balgal Beach is a coastal suburb and a beach in the City of Townsville, Queensland, Australia. The town of Balgal is within the locality. In the 2021 census, Balgal Beach had a population of 998 people.

== Geography ==
Balgal Beach is 59 kilometres (37 mi) north of Townsville, Queensland, Australia, and 64 kilometres (40 mi) south of Ingham, Queensland.

The locality is bounded to the north-east and east by the Coral Sea and to the north-west and west by Rollingstone Creek, which flows into the Coral Sea at the northernmost point of the locality, where the town of Balgal is located (19.0142°S 146.4069°E).

The coastal strip features a long sandy beach, also known as Balgal Beach.

The North Coast railway line forms part of the south-western boundary of the locality. Although the Bruce Highway does not enter the locality, it is adjacent to the south-west boundary of the locality where it has its junction with Balgal Beach Drive (the major thoroughfare in the locality extending to the town of Balgal).

== History ==
Balgal Beach was originally part of the Armidale pastoral lease, settled in 1883 by John Lambert before later changing name to Rollingstone. The area of coastline to the north of Rollingstone was named Balgal Beach in 1947, when the first dwellings were constructed. The name "Balgal" was derived from an Aboriginal word meaning "stone."

The land in this area was predominantly used for farming and grazing, and remained rural until the mid-1980s when the allocation of 500 rural/residential blocks at the Mystic Sands Estate saw the population increase nearly twofold.

Mystic Sands Golf Resort opened in 1993.

== Demographics ==
In the 2006 census, Balgal Beach had a population of 743 people, a 30.3% increase since the 1996 census.

In the 2011 census, Balgal Beach has a population of 849 people.

In the 2016 census, Balgal Beach had a population of 966 people.

In the 2021 census, Balgal Beach had a population of 998 people.

== Education ==
There are no schools in Balgal Beach. The nearest government primary school is Rollingstone State School in neighbouring Rollingstone to the west. The nearest government secondary school is Northern Beaches State High School in Deeragun to the south-east.

== Amenities ==
Located a few kilometres north of the suburb of Rollingstone, Balgal Beach today is a popular destination for recreational activities such as boating, fishing and swimming. Facilities at Balgal Beach include a patrolled stinger enclosure from November to May, a general store/cafe, holiday units and designated camping areas.

Balgal Beach Units is located at 284 Ocean Parade, Balgal Beach. Established for over 40 years as a well loved holiday destination. Offering self contained units and a pool.

Mystic Sands Golf Resort is at 139 Mystic Ave (19.0432°S 146.4210°E). It offers a 9-hole golf course with 18 tees, lawn bowls, swimming pool, tennis courts, an RV camp, restaurant and bar.

There is a boat ramp and pontoon at the northern end of the Esplanade on the south bank of the mouth of Rollingstone Creek (19.0100°S 146.4047°E). It is managed by the Townsville City Council. It provides access to Palm Island and Orpheus Island National Park.
