= Paluma Important Bird Area =

Coordinates: 19°01′51″S 146°15′07″E

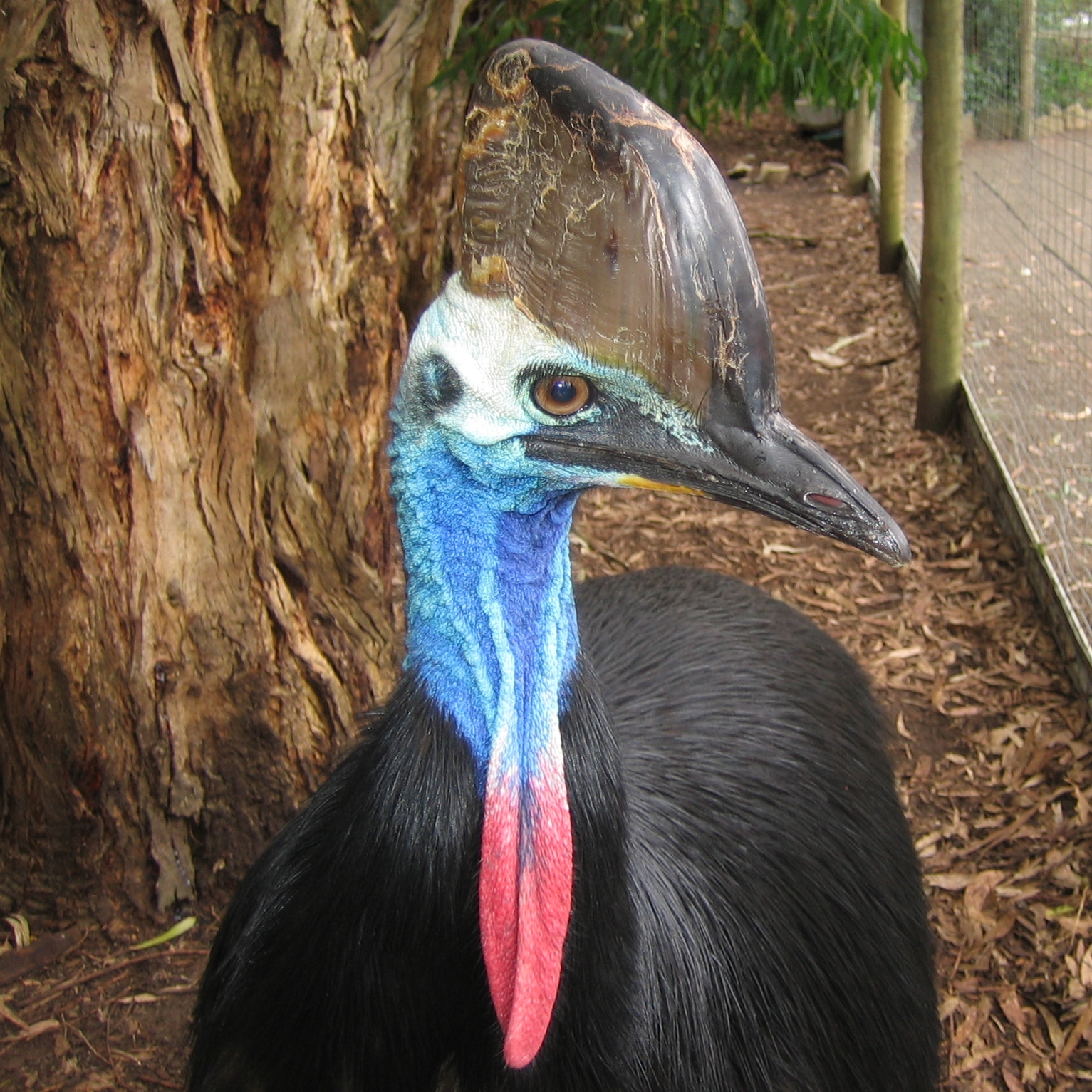
The IBA is an important area for southern cassowaries

The Paluma Important Bird Area consists of the southernmost section of the Wet Tropics World Heritage Site of north Queensland, Australia.

== Description ==
The geology of the 578 km^{2} site is dominated by granite and metamorphic rocks, forming a rugged mountainous landscape covered by tropical rainforest and patches of wet sclerophyll forest. Most of it lies over 800 m above sea level. Much of the site has been selectively logged, though the ecological integrity of the area is still largely intact. It supports almost all the high altitude rainforest bird species endemic to Australia's wet tropics, and could serve as an important climate change refuge.

== Birds ==
The site has been identified by BirdLife International as an Important Bird Area (IBA) because it is a southern outlier for many species and contains a significant population of the vulnerable southern cassowary. It also supports populations of bush stone-curlews, tooth-billed and golden bowerbirds, lovely fairywrens, Macleay's, white-gaped, yellow, bridled and yellow-spotted honeyeaters, fernwrens, mountain thornbills, chowchillas, Bower's shrike-thrushes, pied monarchs, white-browed and pale-yellow robins, and Victoria's riflebirds.

== Other animals ==
As with birds the IBA forms the southernmost extent of distribution for many other endemic animals, including the green ringtail possum, the limbless snake-tooth skink, Boyd's forest dragon, the four-fingered shade skink, and the endangered waterfall frog.
