= Paloma Gómez Enríquez =

Spanish politician

Member of the Senate
- Incumbent
- Assumed office 27 July 2023
- Appointed by: Parliament of Andalusia

Personal details
- Party: Vox

Paloma Gómez Enríquez is a Spanish politician serving as a member of the Senate since 2023. From 2019 to 2023, she was a city councillor of Granada. She is a member of Vox.
