= Paluma, Queensland =

Paluma
- Town
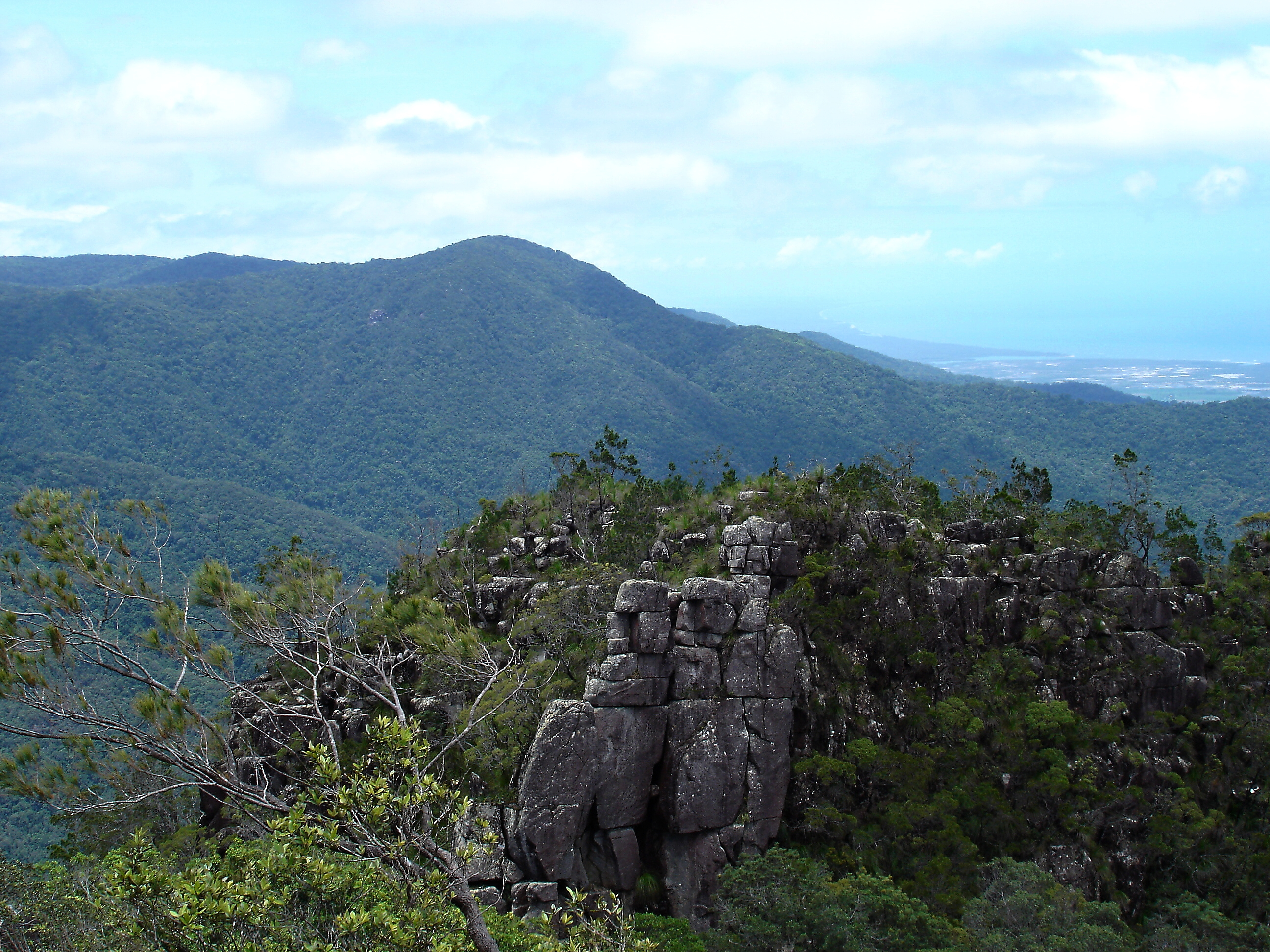
- Looking towards the Coral Sea from Paluma, 2005

- Interactive map of Paluma
- Coordinates: 19.0094°S 146.2094°E
- Country: Australia
- State: Queensland
- LGAs: Townsville City; Charters Towers Region
- Location: 63.9 km (39.7 mi) S of Ingham; 85.5 km (53.1 mi) NW of Townsville CBD; 219 km (136 mi) N of Charters Towers; 1,443 km (897 mi) NNW of Brisbane

Government
  - State electorates: Traeger; Hinchinbrook
  - Federal division: Kennedy

Area
  - Total: 2,296.2 km^{2} (886.6 sq mi)

Population
  - Total: 87 (2021 census)
  - Density: 0.03789/km^{2} (0.0981/sq mi)
- Time zone: UTC+10:00 (AEST)
- Postcode: 4816
Localities around Paluma
Mount Fox	Upper Stone; Yuruga	Bambaroo; Crystal Creek
Valley Of Lagoons	Paluma	Clemant; Lynam
Basalt	Dotswood	Hervey Range

Paluma is a town in the City of Townsville and a locality split between the City of Townsville and the Charters Towers Region in Queensland, Australia. In the 2021 census, the locality of Paluma had a population of 87 people.

It is in the Mount Spec Ranges and is the southernmost point of Townsville's heritage-listed Wet Tropics.

== Geography ==
The town of Paluma is in the east of the locality in the 10 square kilometres (3.9 sq mi) of the locality within the City of Townsville. The residential land use is mostly within the town.The remaining 2,286.2 square kilometres (882.7 sq mi) to the west in the Charters Towers Region has a mix of uses including grazing on native vegetation, the Paluma Range National Park, the Paluma State Forest, and the Mount Zero Taravale Private Nature Reserve (operated by the Australian Wildlife Conservancy).

The now-closed Greenvale railway line passed through the locality which was served by the now-abandoned Girrinjah railway station (19.3196°S 145.9668°E).

Paluma has the following mountains:

- Black Hill (18.9407°S 145.7708°E) 534 metres (1,752 ft)
- Krugers Hill (18.8916°S 145.8968°E)
- Mount Bitalli (18.9157°S 145.7717°E)
- Mount Bradley (19.1341°S 145.8970°E) 548 metres (1,798 ft)
- Mount Brown (19.1238°S 145.8061°E) 449 metres (1,473 ft)
- Mount Foxton (19.2701°S 145.8201°E) 464 metres (1,522 ft)
- Mount Julia (19.1681°S 145.7952°E) 530 metres (1,740 ft)
- Mount Moss (19.0856°S 145.8475°E)
- Mount Nokomis (19.2538°S 146.0350°E) 697 metres (2,287 ft)
- Mount Podge (19.2956°S 145.9494°E) 547 metres (1,795 ft)
- Mount Ryan (18.8850°S 145.9133°E) 815 metres (2,674 ft)
- Mount Spectacle (19.1069°S 145.8470°E) 472 metres (1,549 ft)
- Mount Zero (19.0539°S 146.0968°E) 1,041 metres (3,415 ft)
- Pinnacle (19.1167°S 145.8781°E)
- Powell Knob (19.0919°S 145.8464°E) 439 metres (1,440 ft)
- Snake Hill (18.9556°S 145.7907°E)
- Sugarloaf (18.9764°S 145.7821°E) 567 metres (1,860 ft)
- Trial Hill (18.9807°S 145.8047°E) 662 metres (2,172 ft)
- Twin Hills (18.9866°S 145.7611°E) 579 metres (1,900 ft)
- Willett Knob (19.0879°S 145.8422°E) 427 metres (1,401 ft)

== History ==
The area was originally known as Cloudy Clearing until it was renamed Paluma in 1934.

It developed from a mining and forestry background. The first people to arrive here were tin prospectors in the 1870s after an abundance of tin in the mountains. The area remained isolated until a road was built up the range in the 1930s. This industry lasted for years until landowners worked together to shut it down. The tin industry was using the creeks for washing the tin; however, this was incompatible with using the creeks for Paluma's water supply.

Running River Provisional School opened in 1946 but closed on 31 December 1949. The school re-opened on 2 February 1954 but closed on 21 June 1963. It re-opened on 23 January 1965 and closed on 10 April 1974. It subsequently re-opened and closed permanently on 16 December 1994. It was at 28 Furber Road (also known as Breakaway Road and Ewan Road, 18.9777°S 146.0262°E); it was a 5-acre (2.0 ha) site with a frontage onto Running River.

Paluma Temporary School opened on 28 September 1950, becoming Paluma State School in 1952. The school closed on 19 July 1968 due to falling enrolments.

The Paluma Environmental Education Centre was established in 1977 by the Queensland Department of Education on the site of Paluma State School.

== Demographics ==
In the 2016 census, the locality of Paluma had a population of 68 people.

In the 2021 census, the locality of Paluma had a population of 87 people.

== Heritage listings ==
The Mount Spec Road and Little Crystal Creek Bridge is a heritage-listed road with stone-faced arch bridge in the Mount Spec Ranges built in 1933. It is the only arch road bridge that remains in service in Queensland. Crystal clear water flows down the creek filling the deep pools of Little Crystal Creek, making it an excellent natural swimming hole. It is listed on the Queensland Heritage Register.

== Education ==
Paluma Environmental Education Centre is an Outdoor and Environmental Education Centre at 53 Mt Spec Road (19.0082°S 146.2074°E). The school provides students from years 1 to 12 the opportunity to engage with the natural environment with one of the classrooms built underneath the canopy of the forest.

There are no mainstream schools in Paluma. The nearest government primary schools are Mutarnee State School in Mutarnee to the north-east of the town of Paluma and Mount Fox State School in neighbouring Mount Fox to the north-west. The nearest government secondary school is Ingham State High School in Ingham to the north. However, much of this large locality is too distant from these schools and the options would be distance education or boarding schools.

== See also ==
- Paluma Dam
