= Rollingstone, Queensland =

Rollingstone
- Town
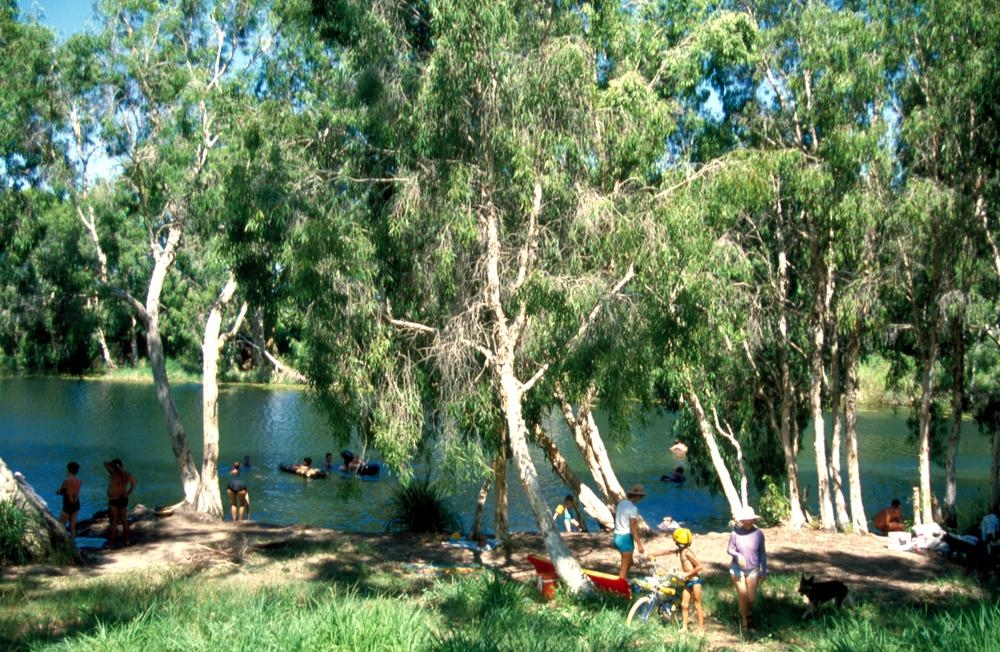
- Swimming in Rollingstone Creek, 1986

- Interactive map of Rollingstone
- Coordinates: 19.0441°S 146.3911°E
- Country: Australia
- State: Queensland
- LGA: City of Townsville
- Location: 38.8 km (24.1 mi) NW of Deeragun; 53.7 km (33.4 mi) NW of Townsville CBD; 1,410 km (880 mi) NNW of Brisbane

Government
  - State electorate: Hinchinbrook
  - Federal division: Kennedy

Area
  - Total: 39.6 km^{2} (15.3 sq mi)

Population
  - Total: 133 (2021 census)
  - Density: 3.359/km^{2} (8.70/sq mi)
- Time zone: UTC+10:00 (AEST)
- Postcode: 4816
Localities around Rollingstone
Crystal Creek	Mutarnee	Coral Sea
Crystal Creek	Rollingstone	Balgal Beach
Crystal Creek	Clemant	Clemant

Rollingstone is a rural town and coastal locality in the City of Townsville, Queensland, Australia. In the 2021 census, the locality of Rollingstone had a population of 133 people.

== Geography ==
Rollingstone is a semi-rural/residential area approximately 54 kilometres (34 mi) north of Townsville, Queensland, Australia, and 57 kilometres (35 mi) south of Ingham, Queensland. The locality is roughly shaped like an hourglass with the town at the narrow centre area.

Rollingston Creek flows to the south and east of the town and into the Coral Sea and forms, in part, the boundary between Rollingstone and neighbouring Balgal Beach.

The Bruce Highway traverses Rollingstone from the south-east to the north, but deviates slightly to the south of the town.

The North Coast railway line runs roughly parallel to the highway but to the north and passes through the town. The locality was served by two railway stations:

- Kinduro railway station, in the north of the locality, now abandoned (19.0165°S 146.3671°E)
- Rollingstone railway station, serving the town (19.0440°S 146.3901°E)

Kinduro is a neighbourhood in the locality (19.0166°S 146.3666°E) around the railway station of the same name. The name Kinduro is an Aboriginal word meaning clear water.

== History ==
Settled in 1883 by John Lambert, the district was originally a pastoral lease known as Armidale, extending from Bluewater Creek in the south to Clerk Creek (later known as Ollera Creek) in the north.

In 1906, the Armidale Hotel opened along the stagecoach route between Townsville and Ingham.

Once the North Coast railway opened through the area in 1915, the Armidale railway station also served as a post office as the mail was delivered by train. However concern over possible confusion with Armidale in New South Wales resulted in the town and railway station being renamed Rollingstone after the creek, which is believed to be named for the round shape of the rocks found in the creek bed. The hotel was renamed the Rollingstone Hotel.

Rollingstone State School officially opened on 4 September 1916 with 28 students on land donated by the hotel owners, John and Isabella Fitzpatrick.

The opening of the railway opened up the beaches north of Townsville for recreational use. The beach near Rollingstone just south of the mouth of Rollingstone Creek was surveyed for a town in 1947 and named Balgal with town land allotments being sold in 1948 onwards (this area is now a separate suburb called Balgal Beach).

Rollingstone and District Community Association was established in 1961 and operated a community hall was located on the Bruce Highway. In 1998, it was replaced by a new community centre built in Balgal Beach.

== Demographics ==
In the 2016 census, the locality of Rollingstone had a population of 125 people.

In the 2021 census, the locality of Rollingstone had a population of 133 people.

== Education ==
Rollingstone State School is a government primary (Prep-6) school for boys and girls on Fred Williams Drive (19.0437°S 146.3915°E). In 2016, the school had an enrolment of 89 students with 6 teachers (5 full-time equivalent) and 5 non-teaching staff (4 full-time equivalent). In 2018, the school had an enrolment of 65 students with 8 teachers (7 full-time equivalent) and 9 non-teaching staff (5 full-time equivalent).

There are no secondary schools in Rollingstone. The nearest government secondary school is Northern Beaches State High School in Deeragun to the south-east.

== Facilities ==
Rollingstone Police Station is at 8 Rollingstone Street (19.0429°S 146.3900°E).

== Amenities ==
Located alongside the Bruce Highway, facilities in Rollingstone include a service station, general store, hotel and caravan park.

Despite the name, Rollingstone Community Centre is at 44 Community Crescent in neighbouring Balgal Beach (19.0447°S 146.4090°E). The Townsville City Council operate a mobile library service which visits the Community Centre every second Wednesday morning.

Rollingstone is a popular location for recreational activities such as camping, picnicking and swimming at Rollingstone Park (als known as Bushy Park) on Rollingstone Road (19.0459°S 146.3927°E) along Rollingstone Creek.

Rollingstone Museum and Visitor Information Centre is in former Rollingstone railway station building, which has been relocated and restored. It is operated by the Rollingstone Historical Society.
