= Paluma Dam =

Dam in Queensland, Australia

- The dam spillway, c. 2007

- Location of the dam in Queensland
- Country: Australia
- Location: City of Townsville, Far North Queensland
- Coordinates: 18°57′28″S 146°08′44″E
- Purpose: Water supply
- Status: Operational
- Construction began: 1957
- Opening date: 1959
- Built by: Thiess Bros
- Operator: Townsville City Council

Dam and spillways
- Type of dam: Embankment dam
- Impounds: Swamp Creek
- Height (foundation): 20 m (66 ft)
- Length: 318 m (1,043 ft)
- Elevation at crest: 894.7 m (2,935 ft) AHD
- Dam volume: 122×10^{3} m^{3} (4.3×10^{6} cu ft)
- Spillway type: Uncontrolled concrete gravity ogee
- Spillway length: 60.9 m (200 ft)
- Spillway capacity: 100 m^{3}/s (3,500 cu ft/s)

Reservoir
- Creates: Lake Paluma
- Total capacity: 11,830 ML (9,590 acre⋅ft)
- Catchment area: 8.9 km^{2} (3.4 sq mi)
- Surface area: 800 ha (2,000 acres)
- Normal elevation: 893.2 m (2,930 ft) AHD
- Website townsville.qld.gov.au

The Paluma Dam is an earth- and rock-fill embankment dam across Swamp Creek, situated on the western slopes of the Paluma Range, north of Townsville, in Far North Queensland, Australia. The resultant reservoir is known as Lake Paluma. Paluma Dam is managed by Townsville City Council.

== Overview ==
The Paluma Dam was constructed between 1957 and 1959 and consists of three earthen and rock embankments. The main embankment has a concrete spillway on the right-hand abutment, a concrete intake tower and conduit, and two saddle dams. When built, the original storage capacity was 10,273 megalitres (8,328 acre⋅ft). The capacity was increased to 11,496 megalitres (9,320 acre⋅ft) in 1981 and then to 11,830 megalitres (9,590 acre⋅ft) in 2020, by adding flashboards to the spillway.

The main dam wall is 20 metres (66 ft) high and is approximately 255 metres (837 ft) long. The two additional saddle dams are 130 metres (430 ft) and 120 metres (390 ft) long respectively. Since 2020, the impounded reservoir has had storage capacity of 11,830 megalitres (9,590 acre⋅ft), covering 800 hectares (2,000 acres) and drawn from a catchment area of 8.9 square kilometres (3.4 sq mi) that includes Paluma Range National Park. The uncontrolled gravity ogee spillway is 60.9 metres (200 ft) long and can handle output of 100 cubic metres per second (3,500 cu ft/s) or 43.2 megalitres (35.0 acre⋅ft) per day.

Water decanted from the dam is piped 4.5 kilometres (2.8 mi) to the Crystal Creek catchment, on the eastern slopes of the Paluma Range. This water supplements natural flow in Crystal Creek, which is drawn from for supply of water to the city of Townsville.

The Paluma Dam can be accessed via Paluma Dam Road. The lake and the surrounding national park are used for recreational activities such as camping, hiking, swimming and non-motorised boating.

== See also ==
- List of dams and reservoirs in Australia
