= Paluma Range National Park =

National park in Australia

- IUCN category II (national park)
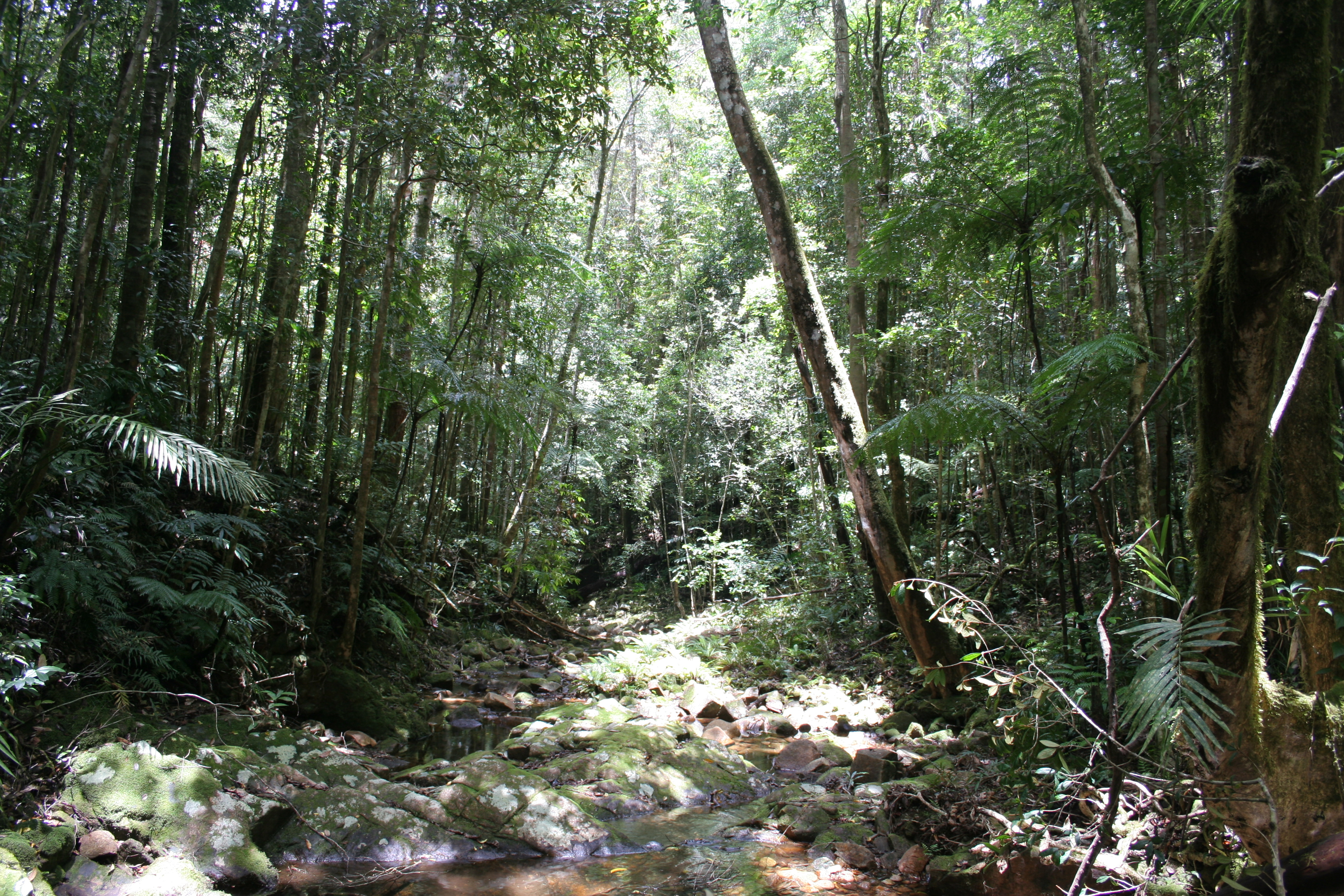

- Location within Queensland
- Location: Queensland
- Nearest city: Townsville
- Coordinates: 18°52′18″S 146°07′30″E
- Area: 172 km^{2} (66 sq mi)
- Established: 1994
- Governing body: Queensland Parks and Wildlife Service
- Website: Official website

Paluma Range is a national park located between Ingham and Townsville, in north Queensland, Australia. The park is 1188 km north of Brisbane.

== Geography ==
The park contains the Jourama Falls, Birthday Creek Falls, Crystal Creek and Lake Paluma.

== Ecology ==
Most of it lies within the Paluma Important Bird Area (IBA), so identified by BirdLife International because it is a southern outlier for many species and contains a significant population of the vulnerable southern cassowary.

== History ==
On National Parks Day 2010 (Sunday, 28 March 2010), the Queensland State Government announced the addition of 6,510 hectares to the Paluma Range National Park.

== See also ==
- Protected areas of Queensland
