= Rosslea, Queensland =

Rosslea
- Suburb
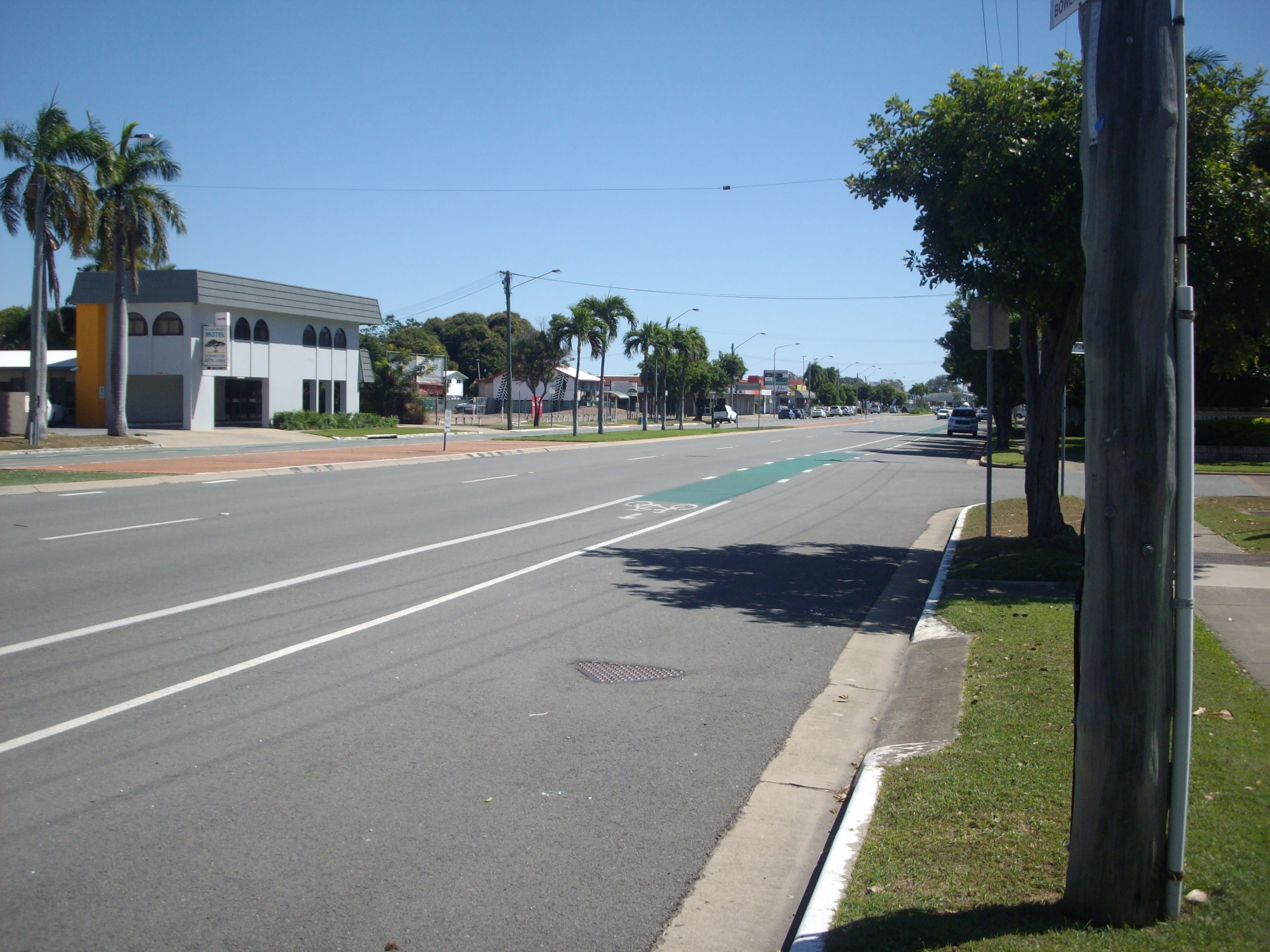
- Bowen Road, Rosslea

- Interactive map of Rosslea
- Coordinates: 19.2980°S 146.8000°E
- Country: Australia
- State: Queensland
- City: Townsville
- LGA: City of Townsville
- Location: 5.6 km (3.5 mi) SE of Townsville CBD; 1,332 km (828 mi) NNW of Brisbane

Government
  - State electorates: Townsville; Mundingburra
  - Federal division: Herbert

Area
  - Total: 1.7 km^{2} (0.66 sq mi)
- Elevation: 5 m (16 ft)

Population
  - Total: 1,903 (2021 census)
  - Density: 1,120/km^{2} (2,900/sq mi)
- Time zone: UTC+10:00 (AEST)
- Postcode: 4812
Suburbs around Rosslea
Mundingburra	Hermit Park	Oonoonba
Mundingburra	Rosslea	Idalia
Annandale	Annandale	Idalia

Rosslea is a suburb of Townsville in the City of Townsville, Queensland, Australia. In the 2021 census, Rosslea had a population of 1,903 people.

== Geography ==
Rosslea is bounded to the east and south by the Ross River. The suburb is very flat (approx 5m above sea level). The eastern half of the suburb is occupied by the Townsville Golf Club (). The rest of the suburb is residential. Townsville Connection Road runs through from south to north-west.

Being low-lying on a river, Rosslea can be affected by flooding, mostly in the golf club area.

== History ==
Rosslea is situated in the traditional Wulgurukaba Aboriginal country.

The name "Rosslea" is a combination of "Ross" (representing the Ross River) and "lea", the Old English word for a grassy meadow.

The Townsville Golf Club is the oldest golf club in Queensland, having been established at Kissing Point in 1893. The club relocated to Aitkenvale in 1921, and then relocated to Rosslea on 18 April 1924.

During 2019, parts of Rosslea suffered during the 2019 Townsville flood.

== Demographics ==
In the 2011 census, Rosslea had a population of 1,600 people.

In the 2016 census, Rosslea had a population of 1,732 people.

In the 2021 census, Rosslea had a population of 1,903 people.

== Education ==
Rosslea Tec-NQ is a private secondary (10–12) campus of Tec-NQ at Douglas at 42-44 Bowen Road (19.2956°S 146.7973°E). The school focuses on hands-on practical learning towards trade qualifications.

There are no government schools in Rosslea. The nearest government primary schools are Mundingburra State School in neighbouring Mundingburra to the west, Oonoonba State School in neighbouring Idalia to the south-east, and Hermit Park State School in Hyde Park to the north. The nearest government secondary schools are William Ross State High School in neighbouring Annandale to the south and Pimlico State High School in Gulliver to the north-west.

== Amenities ==
Townsville Golf Club has an 18-hole golf course at 22 Forrest Street (19.2943°S 146.8008°E). It is open to members and the public.

The Rosslea branch of the Queensland Country Women's Association meets at the CWA Hall at 36 Latchford Street, Pimlico.
