= Mysterton, Queensland =

Mysterton
- Suburb
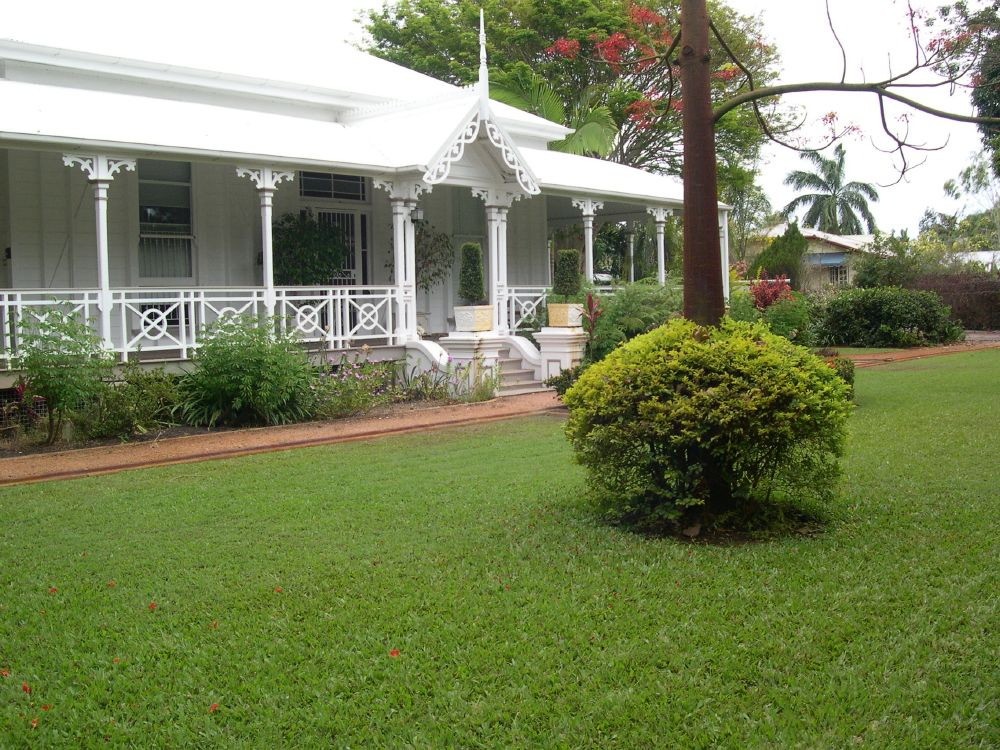
- Rosebank, heritage house in Mysterton, 2015

- Interactive map of Mysterton
- Coordinates: 19.2888°S 146.7927°E
- Country: Australia
- State: Queensland
- City: Townsville
- LGA: City of Townsville
- Location: 3.3 km (2.1 mi) E of Gulliver; 4.3 km (2.7 mi) SW of Townsville CBD; 1,334 km (829 mi) NNW of Brisbane

Government
  - State electorate: Townsville
  - Federal division: Herbert

Area
  - Total: 0.6 km^{2} (0.23 sq mi)

Population
  - Total: 793 (2021 census)
  - Density: 1,320/km^{2} (3,420/sq mi)
- Time zone: UTC+10:00 (AEST)
- Postcode: 4812
Suburbs around Mysterton
| Pimlico | Hyde Park | Hermit Park |
| Pimlico | Mysterton | Hermit Park |
| Pimlico | Mundingburra | Hermit Park |

Mysterton is a suburb in the City of Townsville, Queensland, Australia. It is one of the smallest suburbs in Townsville. In the 2021 census, Mysterton had a population of 793 people.

== Geography ==
Mysterton is predominantly residential, and is situated between the suburbs of Hermit Park, Mundingburra, Pimlico and Hyde Park.

Townsville Connection Road (Charters Towers Road) runs along most of the eastern boundary.

== History ==
Mysterton was given its name in honor of Arminius Danner's house, which at the time of its naming in the 1880s was located in the St. Johns Wood Estate subdivision. During another subdivision in the 1920s, it was known as Mysterton Estate.

== Demographics ==
In the 2011 census, Mysterton had a population of 834 people.

In the 2016 census, Mysterton had a population of 809 people.

In the 2021 census, Mysterton had a population of 793 people.

== Heritage listings ==
Mysterton has a number of heritage-listed sites, including:

- Rosebank, home of Townsville pioneer, Andrew Ball, 21 Lawson Street

== Education ==
There are no schools in Mysterton. The nearest government primary schools are Hermit Park State School in neighbouring Hyde Park to the north and Mundingburra State School in neighbouring Mundingburra to the south. The nearest government secondary school is Pimlico State High School in Gulliver to the west.
