= Currajong, Queensland =

Currajong Townsville, Queensland
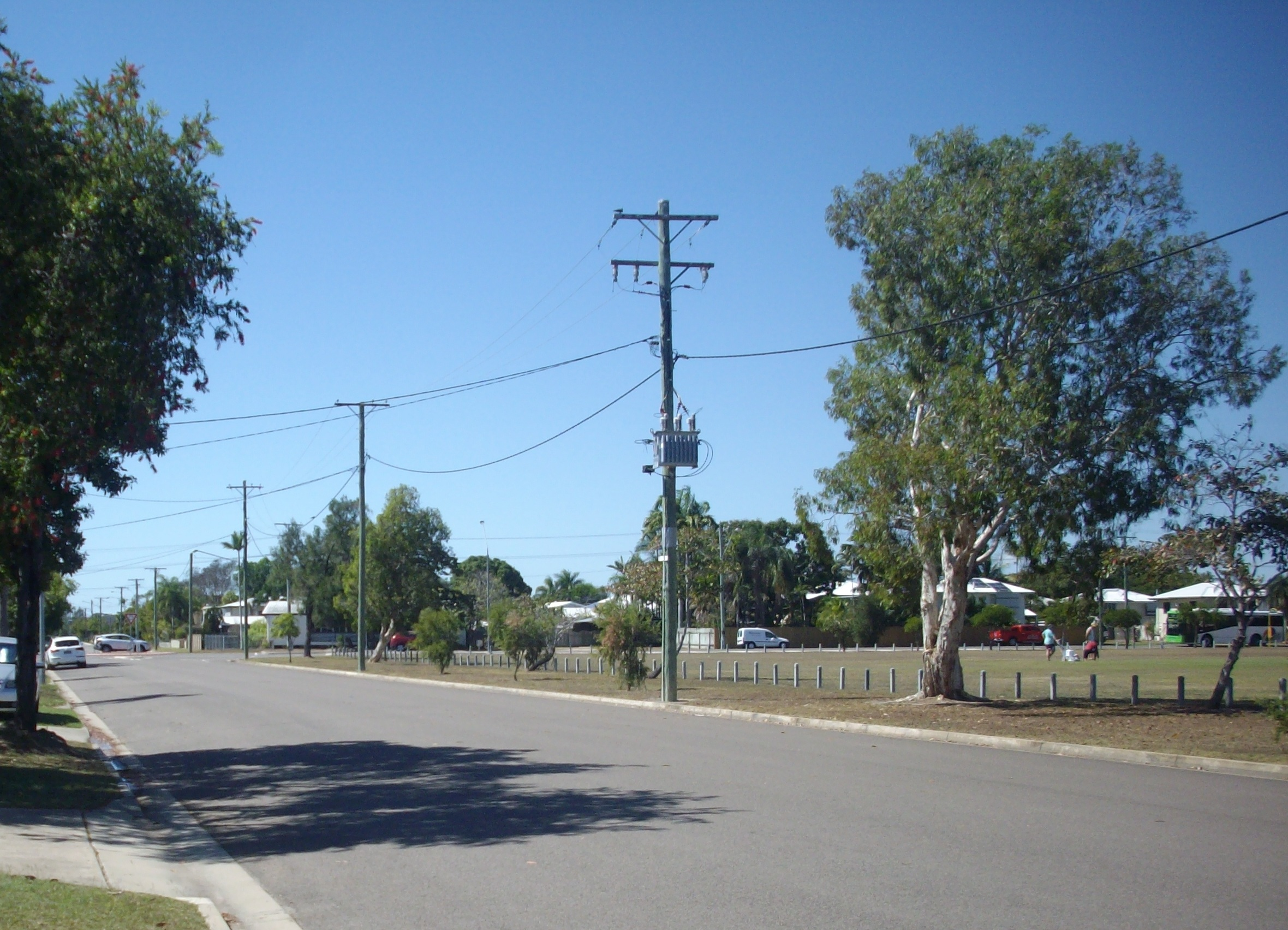
- View of Warrina Park from Hammett Street

- Coordinates: 19.2769°S 146.7777°E
- Population: 2,490 (2021 census)
  - Density: 1,186/km^{2} (3,070/sq mi)
- Postcode(s): 4812
- Area: 2.1 km^{2} (0.8 sq mi)
- Time zone: AEST (UTC+10:00)
- Location: 1.8 km (1 mi) N of Gulliver; 4.9 km (3 mi) SW of Townsville CBD; 1,356 km (843 mi) NNW of Brisbane
- LGA(s): City of Townsville
- State electorate(s): Townsville; Mundingburra
- Federal division(s): Herbert
Suburbs around Currajong:
Garbutt	Garbutt	West End
Vincent	Currajong	Pimlico
Gulliver	Gulliver	Gulliver

Currajong is a suburb in the City of Townsville, Queensland, Australia. In the 2021 census, Currajong had a population of 2,490 people.

== Geography ==
North Townsville Road runs along the northern boundary, and Garbutt–Upper Ross Road runs along the north-western boundary.

== History ==
Currajong is situated in the traditional Wulgurukaba Aboriginal country. The name Currajong is believed to be derived from the name of the residence Currajong in Stagpole Street, West End, owned by Edward Hunt. In about 1888 Hunt planted currajong trees in the grounds.

St John Fisher's Christian Brothers College opened in 1952. It closed on 11 December 1987 to be amalgamated with other Catholic schools, St Margaret Mary’s Primary School (Hermit Park) and Holy Family School (Gulliver) to create The Marian School which opened on 21 January 1988. In 1995, St Mary’s Catholic Primary School (West End) was amalgamated into The Marian School.

Currajong State School opened on 28 June 1954. The school is now within the neighbouring suburb of Gulliver.

== Demographics ==
In the 2011 census, Currajong had a population of 2,628 people.

In the 2016 census, Currajong had a population of 2,548 people.

In the 2021 census, Currajong had a population of 2,490 people.

== Education ==
Marian Catholic School is a Catholic primary (Prep-6) school for boys and girls at 140 Corcoran Street (19.2772°S 146.7816°E). In 2018, the school had an enrolment of 372 students with 24 teachers (19 full-time equivalent) and 20 non-teaching staff (11 full-time equivalent).

There are no government schools in Currajong. The nearest government primary schools are Currajong State School in neighbouring Gulliver to the south and Hermit Park State School in neighbouring Hyde Park to the east. The nearest government secondary school is Pimlico State High School, also in Gulliver.

== Amenities ==
Townsville Wesleyan Methodist Church is at 73 Palmerston Street (corner of Hugh Street, 19.2808°S 146.7825°E). It is part of the Wesleyan Methodist Church.
