= Vincent, Queensland =

Vincent
- Suburb
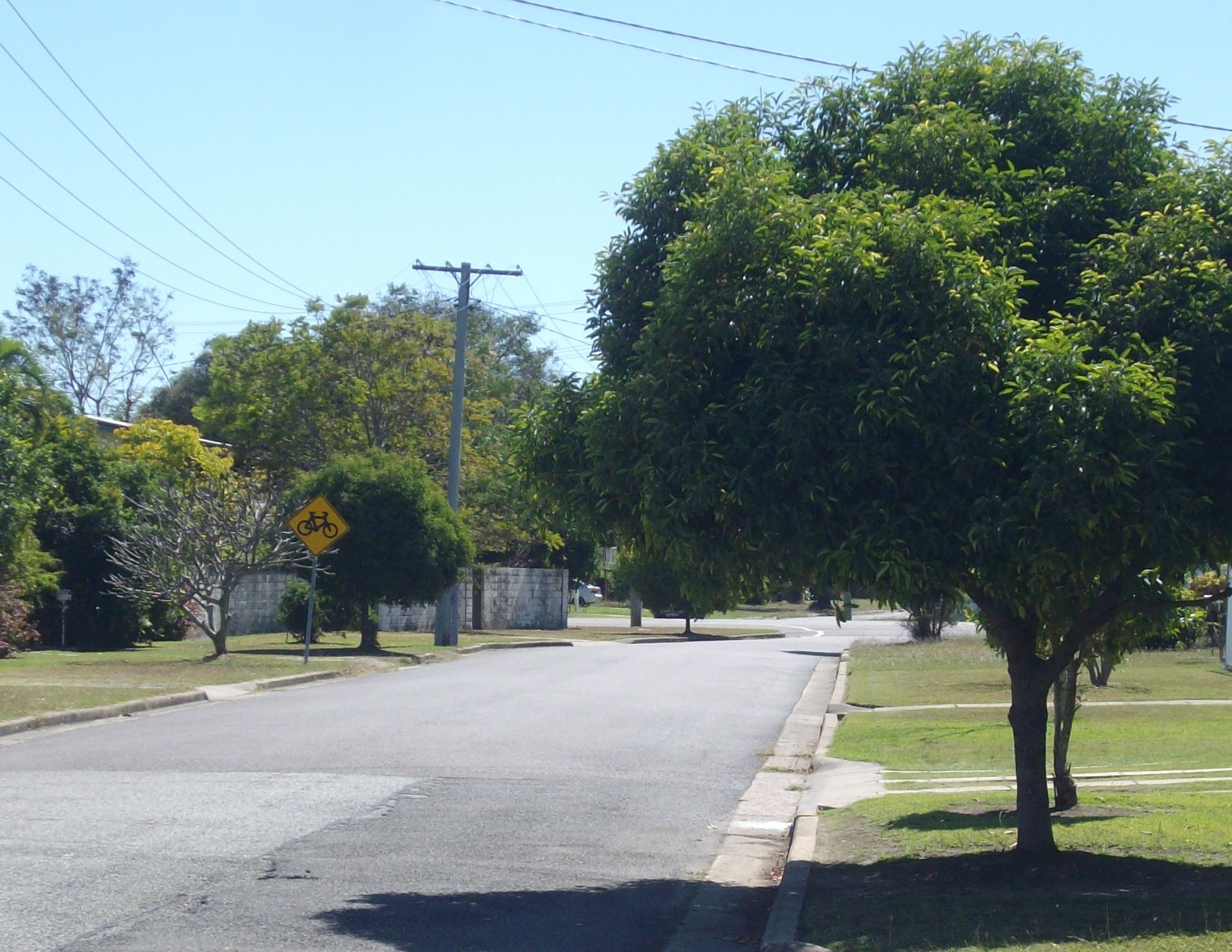
- Borg Street, Vincent

- Interactive map of Vincent
- Coordinates: 19.2841°S 146.7638°E
- Country: Australia
- State: Queensland
- LGA: City of Townsville
- Location: 7.8 km (4.8 mi) SW of Townsville CBD; 1,360 km (850 mi) NNW of Brisbane
- Established: Borg Street, Vincent

Government
  - State electorates: Mundingburra; Thuringowa; Townsville
  - Federal division: Herbert

Area
  - Total: 1.3 km^{2} (0.50 sq mi)

Population
  - Total: 2,213 (2021 census)
  - Density: 1,700/km^{2} (4,410/sq mi)
- Time zone: UTC+10:00 (AEST)
- Postcode: 4814
Suburbs around Vincent
Garbutt	Garbutt	Currajong
Heatley	Vincent	Gulliver
Cranbrook	Aitkenvale	Aitkenvale

Vincent is a suburb of Townsville in the City of Townsville, Queensland, Australia. In the 2021 census, Vincent had a population of 2,213 people.

== Geography ==
Vincent is bounded by the Douglas–Garbutt Road (Nathan Street) to the west, Garbutt–Upper Ross Road (Dalrymple Road) to the north, Cambridge and Anne Streets to the east, and Charles Street to the south. The land use is predominantly residential except for a shopping centre and two schools.

== History ==
Vincent is situated in the traditional Wulgurukaba Aboriginal country. The suburb was named on 1 January 1967 after Major William Slade Vincent of the volunteer militia. He was the first commanding officer of the 3rd Queensland Regiment (Kennedy Regiment) based at Kissing Point, Townsville.

The Vincent State School opened on 30 January 1968.

Parts of Vincent suffered major structural and tree damage from a tornado on the morning of 20 March 2012.

== Demographics ==
In the 2016 census, Vincent had a population of 2,357 people.

In the 2021 census, Vincent had a population of 2,213 people.

== Education ==
Vincent State School is a government primary (Early Childhood-6) school for boys and girls at 280 Palmerston Street (19.2865°S 146.7642°E). In 2017, the school had an enrolment of 130 students with 31 teachers (27 full-time equivalent) and 31 non-teaching staff (17 full-time equivalent). It includes a special education program.

Townsville Christian College is a private primary and secondary (Prep-12) school for boys and girls at 210 Palmerston Street (19.2798°S 146.7667°E). In 2017, the school had an enrolment of 106 students with 7 teachers (6 full-time equivalent) and 10 non-teaching staff (7 full-time equivalent).

There are no government secondary schools in Vincent. The nearest government secondary schools are Heatley Secondary College in Heatley to the west and Pimlico State High School in neighbouring Gulliver to the east.
