= Pimlico, Queensland =

Pimlico
- Suburb
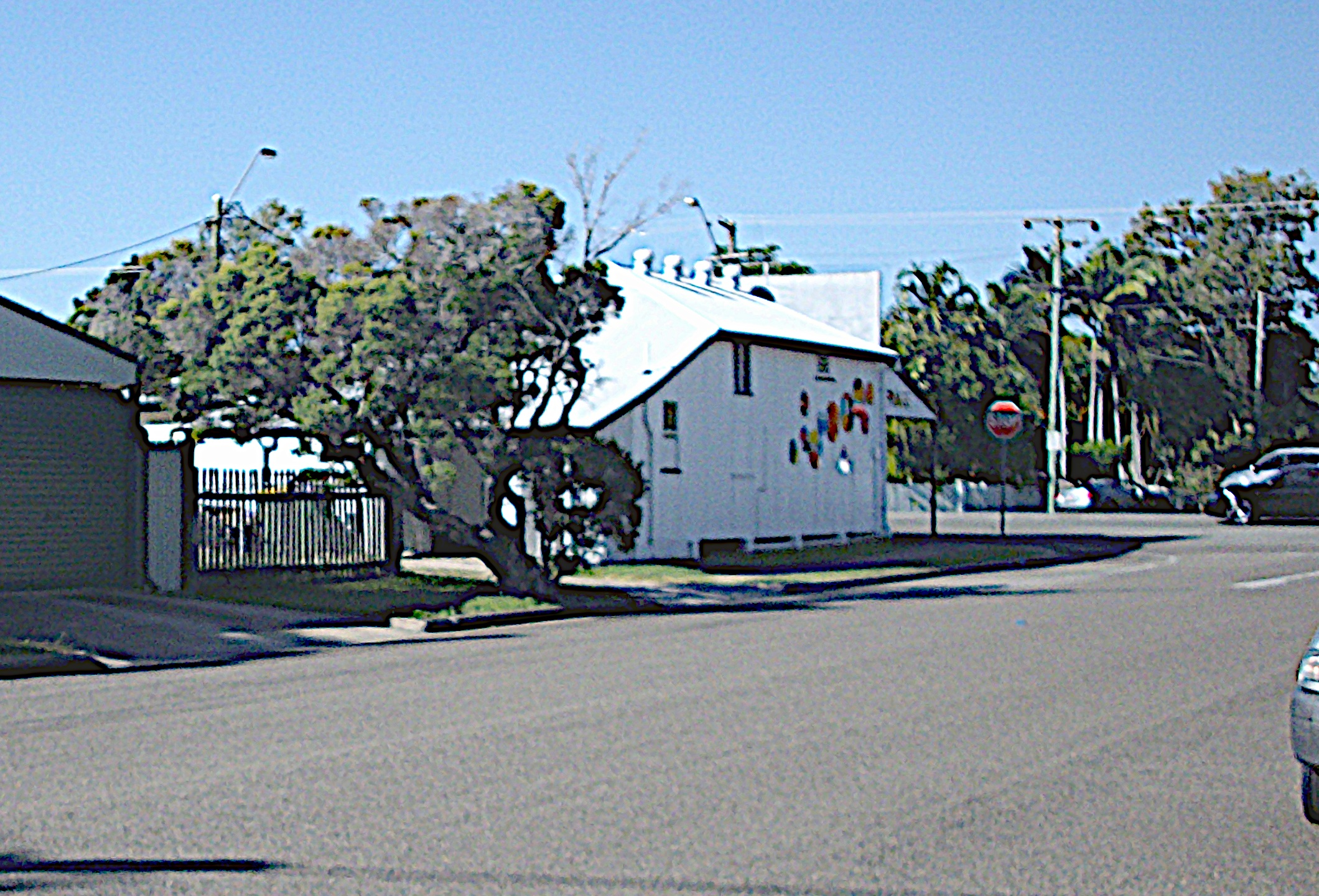
- View from Albury Street, Pimlico

- Interactive map of Pimlico
- Coordinates: 19.2824°S 146.7869°E
- Country: Australia
- State: Queensland
- City: Townsville
- LGA: City of Townsville
- Location: 4.5 km (2.8 mi) W of Railway Estate; 4.9 km (3.0 mi) SW of Townsville CBD; 1,334 km (829 mi) NNW of Brisbane

Government
  - State electorates: Townsville; Mundingburra
  - Federal division: Herbert

Area
  - Total: 1.2 km^{2} (0.46 sq mi)

Population
  - Total: 2,557 (2021 census)
  - Density: 2,130/km^{2} (5,520/sq mi)
- Time zone: UTC+10:00 (AEST)
- Postcode: 4812
Suburbs around Pimlico
Currajong	West End	Hyde Park
Gulliver	Pimlico	Mysterton
Mundingburra	Mundingburra	Mysterton

Pimlico is a suburb of Townsville in the City of Townsville, Queensland, Australia. In the 2021 census, Pimlico had a population of 2,557 people.

== Geography ==
The suburb is roughly rectangular and longer to the north-south than to the east-west. It is bounded to the north by North Townsville Road (Woolcock Street) and to the east by Kings Road. The land is flat and below 10 metres above sea level. The predominant land use is lowset low-density housing.

== History ==
Pimlico is situated in the traditional Wulgurukaba Aboriginal country.

The suburb is believed to be named after either the London suburb of Pimlico or the London trotting track.

Pimlico State High School opened on 27 January 1959.

== Demographics ==
In the 2016 census, Pimlico had a population of 2,460 people.

In the 2021 census, Pimlico had a population of 2,557 people.

== Education ==
There are no schools in Pimlico. The nearest government primary schools are Hermit Park State School in neighbouring Hyde Park to the east, Mundingburra State School in neighbouring Mundingburra to the south, and Currajong State School in neighbouring Gulliver to the west. The nearest government schools are Pimlico State High School in neighbouring Gulliver to the west and Townsville State High School in Railway Estate to the north-east.

== Facilities ==
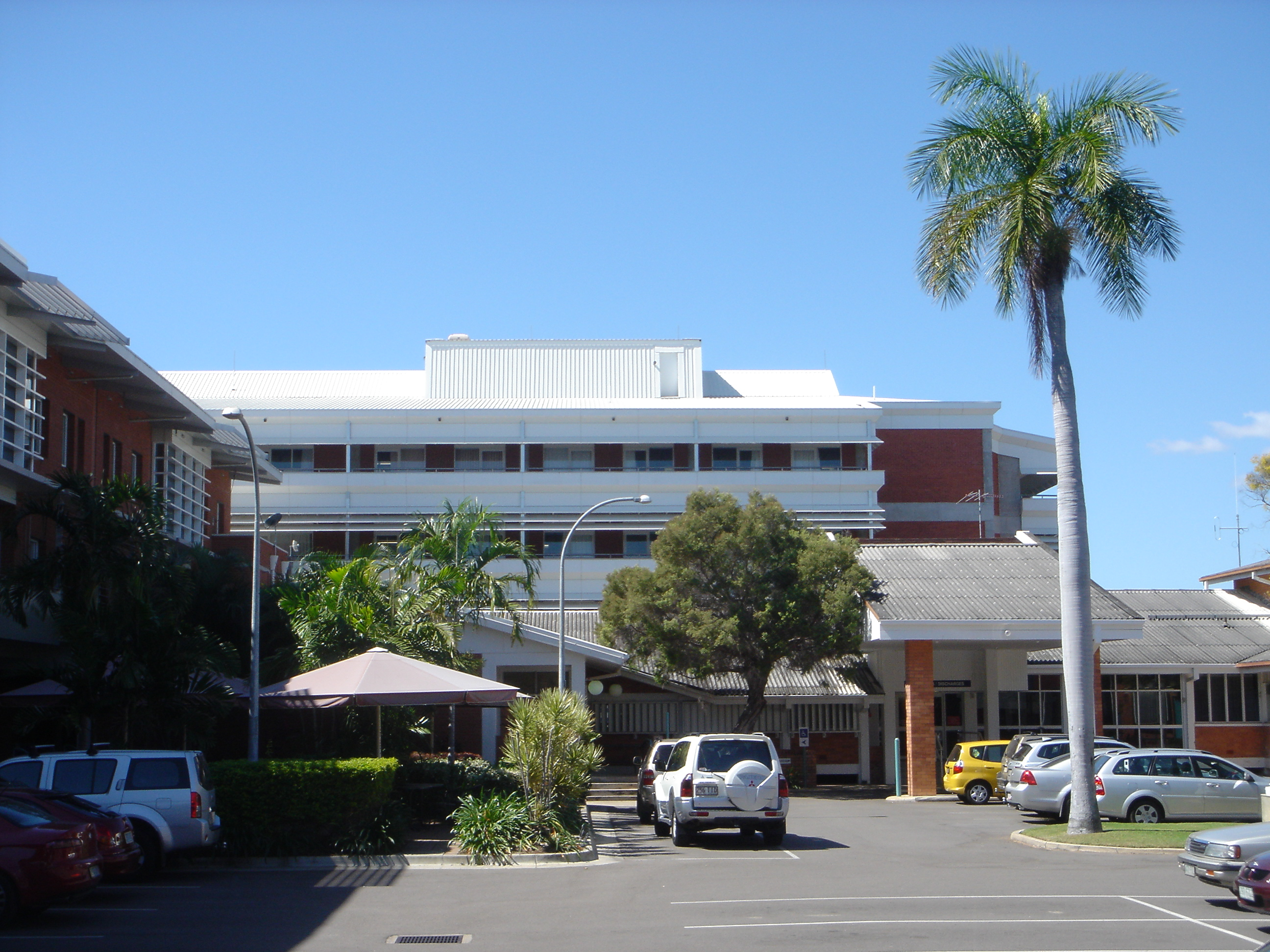
Mater Misericordiae Hospital in Pimlico, view from the inner courtyard

Castletown Shopping Centre occupies the northern end of the suburb.

In the south of the suburb is Townsville's largest private hospital, the Mater Misericordiae Hospital is located in the south of suburb on Fulham Road.

At the southern end of the suburb is the 20-hectare (49-acre) Anderson Park, an arboretum containing particularly fine specimens of pandanus.

Despite its name, as at 2018, Pimlico State High School is on Fulham Road in neighbouring Gulliver, just outside Pimlico's western boundary.

== Community groups ==
The Townsville branch of the Queensland Country Women's Association meets at the CWA Hall at 36 Latchford Street, Pimlico. The Rosslea branch of the Queensland Country Women's Association also meet there.
