= Block A, Townsville Technical College =

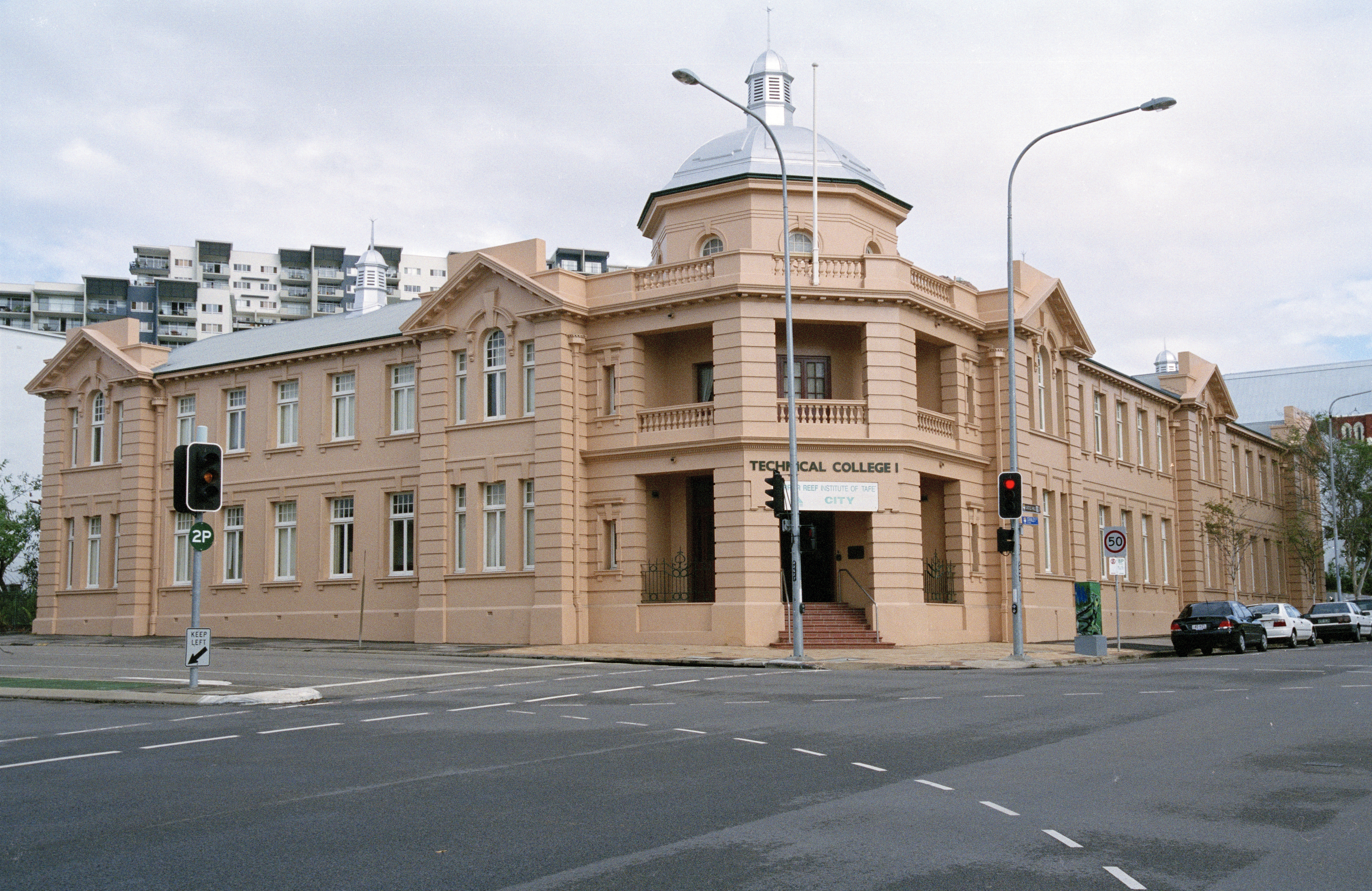
- Block A of Townsville Technical College, 2005

- Location within Queensland Location within Australia
- 19.2599°S 146.8131°E
- Location: 212–260 Stanley Street, Townsville CBD, City of Townsville, Queensland, Australia

History
- Design period: 1919–1930s (interwar period)
- Built: 1920–1921

Site notes
- Architect: Department of Public Works (Queensland)
- Architectural style: Classicism

Queensland Heritage Register
- Official name: Townsville Technical College (former) (Block A, City Campus, Barrier Reef Institute of TAFE), Townsville State High School
- Type: state heritage (landscape, built)
- Designated: 13 May 2004
- Reference no.: 602158
- Significant period: 1920s (historical); 1960s (historical); 1920s (fabric)
- Significant components: college – technical, dome, courtyard

Block A of Townsville Technical College is a heritage-listed technical college building at 212–260 Stanley Street, Townsville CBD, City of Townsville, Queensland, Australia. It was designed by Department of Public Works (Queensland) and built from 1920 to 1921. It is also known as Townsville State High School and the City Campus of the Barrier Reef Institute of TAFE. It was added to the Queensland Heritage Register on 13 May 2004.

== History ==
The building was erected in 1920/21 as the Townsville Technical College. Designed for a prominent corner site by the Architectural Branch of the Queensland Department of Works, it is a substantial two-storeyed masonry edifice. The building also became the Townsville State High School in 1924, reverting to sole use as a technical college in 1964.

In Queensland, local committees were responsible for conducting early courses of technical instruction. Classes in Townsville were initially run by the School of Arts Committee. By 1900 there were five Technical Colleges in Brisbane with classes being taught at eighteen other locations in Queensland. At this time the state government began to take a more active interest, establishing the Board of Technical Education in 1902 with the aim of improving and expanding technical education throughout the State. A Technical Education Branch of the Department of Public Instruction, under the direction of R. M. Riddell, replaced the Board in 1905 and legislation, introduced in 1908 and 1918, progressively empowered the government to take over existing technical colleges.

At a conference in 1904, Riddell defined the role of technical as opposed to secondary studies. The prime duty of technical colleges, he maintained, was to meet trade requirements. In mining, agricultural and industrial districts, technical education received a boost when employers, such as the Mount Morgan Mining Company and the State railway workshops accepted the idea of technical training for employees and apprentices. Enrolments jumped from 3,000 to 4,000 in 1905. By 1910, Queensland had a comprehensive system of technical education.

In 1908, the Technical College committee in Townsville erected a new building on the School of Arts site, on the corner of Stanley and Walker Streets. The building proved to be unsuitable for technical classes and a report by the Director of Technical Education suggested the construction of a new building. The government was slow to respond and only after concerted lobbying by committee members was the construction of a Technical College in Townsville approved.

An allotment on the opposite corner of Stanley and Walker Streets was resumed in 1917 under the Public Works Land Resumption Act 1906. The Architectural Branch of the Department of Works prepared plans for a new building with an estimated cost of £15,922. The local committee was required to fund one-fifth of the total amount. Construction was delayed for several years but the building was eventually ready for occupation on 19 April 1921. The building was of two storeys: the ground floor comprised vestibule, office, classrooms for applied mechanics, drawing, science, book keeping, shorthand and typing and the first floor comprised library, teachers room, classrooms for mathematics, art, millinery and dressmaking and cookery.

The new building enabled an expansion of technical courses in Townsville but the Department of Public Instruction decided that some students also needed access to general subjects. At the time no public secondary school existed in Townsville and the Department decided to open a High School in conjunction with the Technical College.

Due to the emphasis placed on vocational and technical training by the Department of Public Instruction, a formal high school system was not introduced in Queensland until February 1912. In 1911 the Queensland Legislative Assembly had granted funds for the establishment of high schools in towns were there was no grammar school and by 1912 six state high schools had been established. While the Queensland Government was reluctant to compete directly with the grammar schools by setting up high schools in opposition, it had no hesitation in annexing technical colleges in grammar school towns. The high schools could be accommodated in the existing technical colleges, minimising expenditure. The buildings were used as high schools by day and as technical colleges at night.

The Townsville High School was opened on 1 July 1924, with 63 students. Additional accommodation was necessary by the mid 1930s and in 1939 the Stanley Street wing was extended, in the same architectural style, to provide extra classrooms.

In 1964 Townsville State High School was relocated to a new complex at Boundary Street, South Townsville (now Railway Estate) and the site at Walker/Stanley Streets continued to provide technical education as the Townsville TAFE College. After the construction of a new TAFE campus on Fulham Road, Pimlico, the Walker/Stanley Street complex became known as the City Campus of the Barrier Reef Institute of TAFE, where the 1920/21 building functioned as an administration and classroom block.

Youth With A Mission (YWAM) moved into the building in 2013.

== Description ==
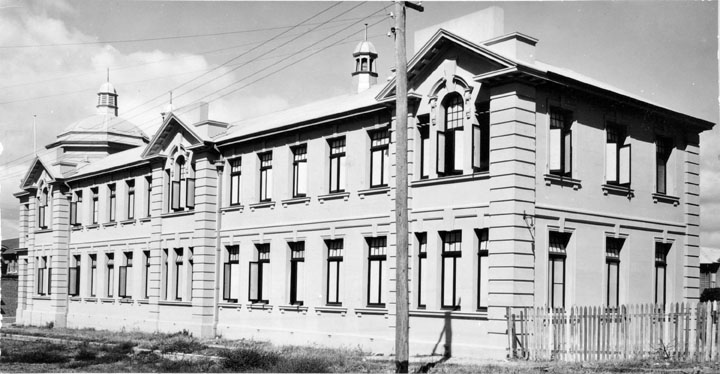
Townsville Technical College after the 1939 additions to the Stanley Street wing

Block A is a prominent building being situated on the corner of Stanley and Walker Streets, against the dramatic backdrop of Castle Hill. The two-storeyed masonry building with a metal roof forms part of a group of buildings on the southern side of Stanley Street, including the former Townsville School of Arts and the Sacred Heart Cathedral, that contribute to the aesthetic qualities of views to Castle Hill.

Built to the street alignment, the building is composed of three main parts, a truncated corner structure and two flanking wings arranged in an L-shaped plan. The classical design of the facade is evident in the regular arrangement of windows, varied roofline of pediments and domes and classical detailing in balustrades and mouldings. The symmetrical composition emphasises the corner location. The external walls of the building are brickwork, rendered and painted where visible from the street.

The main entry is located at the truncated corner facing the Stanley and Walker Street intersection. In contrast to the rest of the facade, the entrance vestibule and the conference room, immediately above, are recessed behind narrow verandahs and surmounted by an octagonal dome. Each face of the octagonal base of the dome has a round window. A vented fleche surmounts the dome and three other similar fleches are mounted on the ridge of the roof. Panels of classical balusters form the parapet around the dome and the balustrade to the upper level verandah. The ground floor verandah has wrought iron balustrades.

On each of the street facades; adjacent to the corner structure, at the ends of each wing and in the centre of the Stanley Street wing, are projecting bays surmounted by open bed pediments and stepped parapets. Banded rustication emphasises the corners of the bays. Windows in the bays are arranged in groups of three, with two single sashes flanking a pair of casement windows. On the upper level of each bay the central window is arched. The elaborate moulding and keystone over the arched window protrude into the tympanum above. Windows are generally pairs of timber casements with pivoting highlights over.

The ground floor is raised above the street and a half flight of stairs at the street corner leads to glazed timber doors opening onto the entry vestibule. The entry vestibule is octagonal in plan with timber panelling up to door head height and a tiled floor. French doors open from the vestibule onto the narrow verandahs overlooking the street. The main stair, opposite the entrance door, consists of a single flight splitting midway up into two curved flights, positioned at 90 degrees to the lower flight. The stair, which is framed by an ornamental arch, has a decorative wrought iron balustrade and timber handrail. The flat-sheeted ceiling of the vestibule has timber cover battens laid out in a pattern reflecting the geometry of the room. A reception office is located adjacent to the entry vestibule. The entry vestibule opens onto verandahs on the back of the building that enclose two sides of a courtyard.

Each level of the building is similar in plan with offices and classrooms accessed from the rear verandahs. Lattice screens and timber doors secure the entry vestibule from the verandahs on the lower level. The verandahs have painted brick columns, timber floors and vertical slatted balustrades and are partly enclosed by brick walls and toilet facilities. The lower level verandah has a flat ripple iron ceiling and lattice valence while the upper level has a raked timber boarded ceiling. Half glazed timber doors to classrooms and offices open directly from the verandah. The walls facing onto the verandahs are unpainted brickwork. Window heads and sills are concrete. A flight of stairs, enclosed with lattice panels and doors, is located along the external edge of the verandah on the Stanley Street wing. A connection has been built between the western end of the Stanley Street wing and the adjoining Block E. A raised concrete walkway joins the end of the verandah on the upper level of the Walker Street wing.

On the first floor level above the main stair, a pair of silky oak doors with matching side lights open into the octagonal conference room. The conference room is a double height space encircled by a mezzanine gallery and lit from above by circular windows. A set of French doors opposite the entrance doors opens onto the verandah which overlooks the street. The ceiling of the space is domed and has timber cover battens relating to the geometry of the dome. The gallery, reached by a set of narrow stairs in a niche off the main space, has an iron balustrade incorporating a circular motif in the design.

The offices and classrooms have flat sheeted ceilings with timber cover battens laid out in a variety of orthogonal patterns. Timber framed vertical sliding black boards remain in some of the rooms. Exposed air conditioning ducts have been installed in some classrooms and offices.

The courtyard at the rear of the building contains a tropical garden.

== Heritage listing ==
Block A of the Townsville Technical College was listed on the Queensland Heritage Register on 13 May 2004 having satisfied the following criteria.

The place is important in demonstrating the evolution or pattern of Queensland's history.

Designed and erected in 1920/21 as a technical college and utilized soon after construction as Townsville's first high school, the former Townsville Technical College demonstrates the evolution of the Queensland Government's post-primary educational strategies. This building together with the former School of Arts on the opposite corner, show the pattern of development of technical education in Queensland, from establishment by local committees to subsequent government control in the early 20th century. Used since 1921 as a technical college and from 1924 to 1964 as a high school and technical college, the place demonstrates the development of technical and secondary education in important regional centres like Townsville.

The place is important in demonstrating the principal characteristics of a particular class of cultural places.

Designed for its prominent corner location, the former Townsville Technical College is a fine example of an interwar public building in a classical style and is an excellent intact example of an early 20th century educational building designed by the Architectural Branch of the Queensland Department of Works. It is important in illustrating the principal characteristics of an early 20th century purpose-built technical college, including joint use for many years as a high school. The imposing classical facades and simple rational planning utilising open verandahs reflect Queensland government policy of the time, to raise community awareness about the value of technical training through the construction of a well designed building with a strong presence in the townscape. The former Townsville Technical College incorporates natural lighting and ventilation, and appropriate classroom arrangements and facilities for hygiene, which were common themes in the design of educational buildings in the first half of the 20th century.

The place is important because of its aesthetic significance.

The former Townsville Technical College is part of a small group of historic buildings including the former School of Arts building and the Sacred Heart Cathedral, that create the foreground to picturesque views of Stanley Street dominated by the looming presence of Castle Hill.

The place has a strong or special association with a particular community or cultural group for social, cultural or spiritual reasons.

In continuing use as a technical college over a period of more than eighty years and as Townsville's first high school, the former Townsville Technical College has a special association for the Townsville community with the provision of State secondary and technical education.
