= Mundingburra, Queensland =

Mundingburra
- Suburb
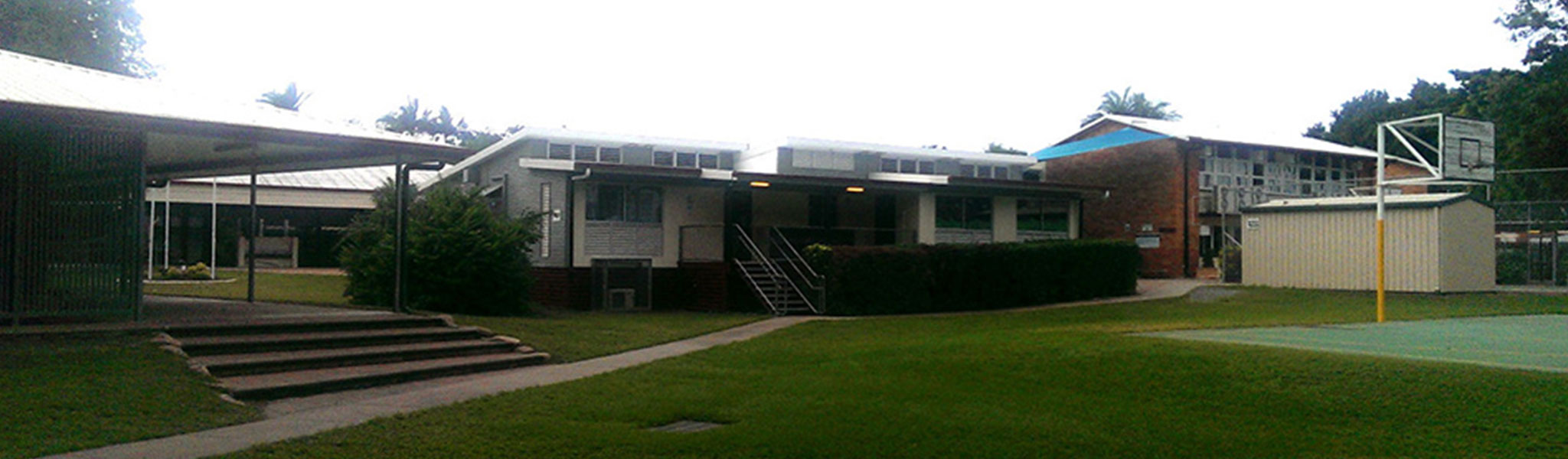
- Mundingburra State School, 2022

- Interactive map of Mundingburra
- Coordinates: 19.2994°S 146.7858°E
- Country: Australia
- State: Queensland
- City: Townsville
- LGA: City of Townsville
- Location: 6.1 km (3.8 mi) SW of Townsville CBD; 1,330 km (830 mi) NNW of Brisbane

Government
  - State electorate: Mundingburra
  - Federal division: Herbert

Area
  - Total: 2.5 km^{2} (0.97 sq mi)

Population
  - Total: 3,594 (2021 census)
  - Density: 1,438/km^{2} (3,720/sq mi)
- Time zone: UTC+10:00 (AEST)
- Postcode: 4812
Suburbs around Mundingburra
Gulliver	Pimlico	Mysterton
Aitkenvale	Mundingburra	Hermit Park
Aitkenvale	Annandale	Rosslea

Mundingburra is a suburb of Townsville in the City of Townsville, Queensland, Australia. In the 2021 census, Mundingburra had a population of 3,594 people.

== Geography ==
Mundingburra is predominantly a residential suburb that is situated on the bank of the Ross River, adjacent to the suburb of Aitkenvale. Aplin's Weir crosses the Ross River between Mundingburra and Annandale (19.3039°S 146.7807°E).

Ross River Road runs through from east to west. and Townsville Connection Road runs along part of the eastern boundary.

The Electoral district of Mundingburra which the suburb is situated in, is named after the suburb.

== History ==
Mundingburra State School opened on 22 September 1884.

St Anne's Church of England Girls’ School opened on 1 January 1917 with an initial enrolment of 71 students at 103 Walker Street in the Townsville CBD (now occupied by the Townsville City Council centre). It was operated by the Society of the Sacred Advent. From 1942 to 1945 during World War II when a Japanese invasion was feared, the school was evacuated to Ravenswood while the Women's Auxiliary Australian Air Force occupied the school's facilities in Townsville. In 1953, the need for expand results in the purchase of 23 acres (9.3 ha) of land in Mundingburra, where the foundation stone is laid in 1956. The Mundingburra site is officially opened on 13 April 1958 with the move to the new site taking place at the end of August 1958. In 1978, the Sisters of the Sacred Advent leave the school, passing control to the Anglican Diocese of Townsville which appoints Neil Tucker as the school's first lay principal and first male principal. In 1980 the school is fully co-educational and, to reflect this, the school is renamed as The Cathedral School of St Anne & St James (where St James being the name of Townsville's Anglican cathedral).

The Cathedral School of St. Anne & St. James and celebrated its centenary in 2017.

St Joseph's Catholic School was established in 1924 in Norris Street in Hermit Park by the Sisters of St Joseph of the Sacred Heart. In 1936, the school was relocated to its current site in Mundingburra. The Sisters' involvement with the school ceased at the end of 1991; it now operates with lay staff.

Mundingburra South Special School opened in 1981 and closed on 12 December 1986.

Mundingburra Special School opened on 27 January 1987 and closed in December 2001, to reopen in January 2002 at the same location as Townsville Community Learning Centre as a merger with Aitkenvale Special School in neighbouring Aitkenvale.

== Demographics ==
In the 2016 census, Mundingburra had a population of 3,620 people.

In the 2021 census, Mundingburra had a population of 3,594 people with 39.4% describing their ancestry as English. This is followed by 35.6% describing their ancestry as Australian, and 13.8% as Irish. 78.2% of Mundingburra residents were born in Australia, followed by 2.9% in England, 2.1% in New Zealand and 0.9% in India. 85.5% spoke only English at home followed by the next most common languages: 0.6% Italian, 0.6% African languages, 0.5% Japanese, 0.5% Swahili and 0.4% Arabic.

== Education ==
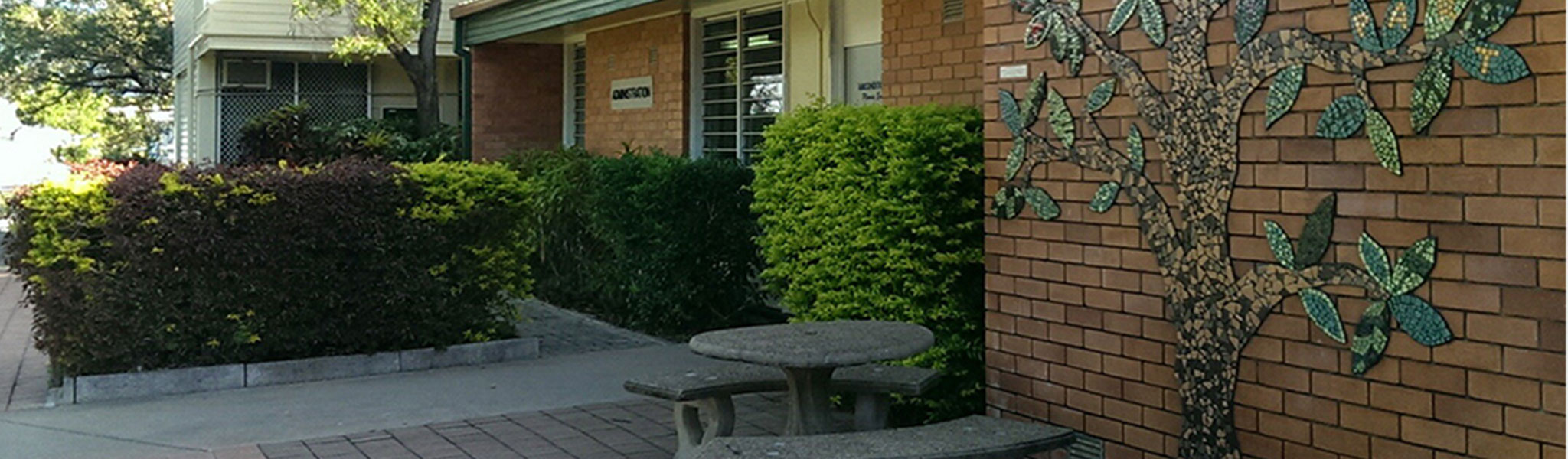
Mundingburra State School, circa 2022

Mundingburra State School is a government primary (Prep–6) school for boys and girls at 77 Ross River Road (19.2945°S 146.7896°E). In 2017, the school had an enrolment of 688 students with 48 teachers (45 full-time equivalent) and 27 non-teaching staff (18 full-time equivalent). The school has a special education program. The school is adjacent to the Anderson Park, Pimlico.

Townsville Community Learning Centre is a special education primary and secondary (Prep-12) school for boys and girls at 78 Thompson Street (19.3037°S 146.7769°E). In 2017, the school had an enrolment of 174 students with 50 teachers (46 full-time equivalent) and 66 non-teaching staff (44 full-time equivalent).

St Joseph's Catholic School is a Catholic primary (Prep–6) school for boys and girls at 65–75 Ross River Road (19.2941°S 146.7906°E). In 2017, the school had an enrolment of 381 students with 26 teachers (21 full-time equivalent) and 22 non-teaching staff (14 full-time equivalent).

The Cathedral School of St Anne and St James is a private primary and secondary (Prep–12) Anglican school for boys and girls at 154–182 Ross River Road (19.2958°S 146.7790°E). It also offers Early Childhood and Kindergarten programs and boarding facilities from Year 7 to 12. In 2017, the school had an enrolment of 1,008 students with 93 teachers (89 full-time equivalent) and 93 non-teaching staff (69 full-time equivalent).

There is no government secondary school in Mundingburra. The nearest government secondary school is Pimlico State High School in neighbouring Gulliver to the north-west.

== Facilities ==
Villa Vincent is an aged care centre at 2 Acacia Street (19.2904°S 146.7807°E). It is operated by OzCare.

== Amenities ==
There are a number of parks in the area:

- Anderson Park Botanical Gardens (19.2923°S 146.7819°E)
- Farrar Street Park (19.2989°S 146.7822°E)
- Riverside Park (19.2996°S 146.7920°E)
- Sherriff Park (19.2998°S 146.7936°E)
