= Townsville road network =

Group of roads in Queensland, Australia

Townsville road network is a group of roads that provide access to the urban areas of Townsville in Queensland, Australia, and enable travel between the communities. Most of the roads retain their original road or street names, and are not well known by their official names.

== Roads in the network ==
In addition to the Bruce Highway, the Flinders Highway, and the Hervey Range Developmental Road, the network consists of the following state-controlled roads:

- Angus Smith Drive Connection Road
- Discovery Drive Connection Road
- Douglas–Garbutt Road
- Garbutt–Upper Ross Road
- North Townsville Road
- North Ward Road
- Ross River Road
- Shaw Road
- South Townsville Road
- Townsville Connection Road
- Townsville Port Road

A number of local roads that also link the localities are not included in this article.

== Angus Smith Drive Connection Road ==
Angus Smith Drive Connection Road
- Location: Bruce Highway, Douglas to Douglas–Garbutt Road (University Road), Douglas / Annandale
- Length: 1.1 km (0.68 mi)

Angus Smith Drive Connection Road is a state-controlled district road (number 837). It runs from Bruce Highway exit and entry ramps in Douglas to the Douglas–Garbutt Road (University Road) on the Douglas / Annandale midpoint, a distance of 1.1 kilometres (0.68 mi).

The road starts at a roundabout intersection just south of the Bruce Highway in Douglas. It runs north and then north-east as a four-lane divided road, known locally as Angus Smith Drive. (A local road of the same name runs west from the roundabout.) The road passes a northbound entry ramp to the Bruce Highway, runs under the highway, passes a southbound exit ramp from the highway, and continues to a roundabout intersection with the Douglas–Garbutt Road (known locally as University Road), where it ends. Its only major intersection is with the Bruce Highway.

== Discovery Drive Connection Road ==
Discovery Drive Connection Road
- Location: Douglas–Garbutt Road (University Road), Douglas / Annandale to Discovery Drive, Douglas
- Length: 0.27 km (0.17 mi; 890 ft)

Discovery Drive Connection Road is a state-controlled district road (number 839). It runs from Douglas–Garbutt Road (University Road) on the Douglas / Annandale midpoint to an intersection with the Townsville University Hospital entry road in Douglas, a distance of 0.27 kilometres (0.17 mi).

The road starts at a roundabout intersection with Douglas–Garbutt Road just north of the Bruce Highway in Douglas. It runs south-west and then south-east as a mostly four-lane divided road, known locally as Discovery Drive. The road runs under the Bruce Highway and continues to an intersection with the Townsville University Hospital entry road, where it ends, while Discovery Drive continues south as a local road. The road has no major intersections.

== Douglas–Garbutt Road ==
Douglas–Garbutt Road
- Location: Bruce Highway, Douglas / Annandale to North Townsville Road (Woolcock Street), Garbutt
- Length: 5.9 km (3.7 mi)

Douglas–Garbutt Road is a state-controlled district road (number 840). It runs from the Bruce Highway on the Douglas / Annandale midpoint to the North Townsville Road (Woolcock Street) in Garbutt, a distance of 5.9 kilometres (3.7 mi).

The road starts at an intersection with the Bruce Highway on the Douglas / Annandale midpoint. It runs north-west as a four-lane divided road, known locally as University Road, following the boundary between Douglas and Annandale. It passes the exits to Discovery Drive Connection Road and Angus Smith Drive Connection Road before reaching the Ross River.

On crossing the river the road turns north and changes name to Nathan Street. It runs between Cranbrook and Aitkenvale until it reaches Ross River Road, which it crosses while continuing north before turning slightly north-west. It then runs between Heatley and Vincent until it reaches Garbutt–Upper Ross Road (Dalrymple Road). After crossing this road it enters Garbutt and turns north as Duckworth Street. It continues north to an intersection with North Townsville Road (Woolcock Street), where it ends. Duckworth Street continues north as a local road.

=== Major intersections (Douglas–Garbutt Road) ===
All distances are from Google Maps. The entire road is within the Townsville local government area.

Location	km	mi	Destinations	Notes
Douglas / Annandale midpoint	0	0.0	Bruce Highway – east – Murray – west – Condon	Southern end of Douglas–Garbutt Road; The road starts as University Road.
Douglas / Annandale midpoint	0.4	0.25	Discovery Drive Connection Road – southwest – Douglas; Yolanda Drive – northeast – Annandale	Road continues northwest.
Douglas / Annandale midpoint	0.85	0.53	Angus Smith Drive Connection Road – southwest – Douglas	Road continues northwest.
Douglas / Annandale / Cranbrook / Aitkenvale quadpoint	1.4– 1.6	0.87– 0.99	Ross River	Name changes to Nathan Street. Road continues north.
Cranbrook / Aitkenvale midpoint	2.6	1.6	Ross River Road – east – Mundingburra – southwest – Thuringowa Central	Road continues north.
Heatley / Vincent / Garbutt tripoint	4.6	2.9	Garbutt–Upper Ross Road (Dalrymple Road) – northeast – Garbutt, Currajong – southwest – Kirwan	Name changes to Duckworth Street. Road continues north.
Garbutt	5.9	3.7	North Townsville Road (Woolcock Street) – east – Garbutt, Currajong – west – Mount Louisa	Northern end of Douglas–Garbutt Road. Duckworth Street continues north.
1.000 mi = 1.609 km; 1.000 km = 0.621 mi: Route transition

== Garbutt–Upper Ross Road ==
Garbutt–Upper Ross Road
- Location: North Townsville Road (Woolcock Street), Garbutt to Riverway Drive, Kelso
- Length: 18.7 km (11.6 mi)
- Route number: 93

Garbutt–Upper Ross Road is a state-controlled district road (number 835). It runs from North Townsville Road (Woolcock Street) in Garbutt to Riverway Drive in Kelso, a distance of 18.7 kilometres (11.6 mi).

The road starts at an intersection with North Townsville Road (Woolcock Street) in Garbutt. It is signed as State Route 93. It runs south-west as a four-lane divided road, known locally as Dalrymple Road, following the boundary between Garbutt and Currajong, then between Garbutt and Vincent. After crossing Douglas–Garbutt Road it runs between Garbutt and Heatley, then between Mount Louisa and Heatley, and then through the southern extremity of Mount Louisa. It reaches an intersection where it turns south as Thuringowa Drive. Dalrymple Road continues west as a local road.

Continuing south-east through Kirwan and passing a small part of Thuringowa Central, the road arrives at an intersection with Hervey Range Developmental Road and Ross River Road. It continues south through Thuringowa Central as Riverway Drive, passes through an intersection with the Bruce Highway, and then follows the western bank of the Ross River through Condon, Rasmussen, and Kelso. The road ends at the entry road to the Ross River Dam. Riverway Drive continues south-west as a local road.

=== Riverway Drive upgrade ===
A project to upgrade a 3.1 kilometres (1.9 mi) section of Riverway Drive, at a cost of $95 million, was expected to start in 2023.

=== Major intersections (Garbutt–Upper Ross Road) ===
All distances are from Google Maps. The entire road is within the Townsville local government area.

Location	km	mi	Destinations	Notes
Garbutt	0	0.0	North Townsville Road (Woolcock Street) – west – Mount Louisa – east – West End, Currajong	Northern end of Garbutt–Upper Ross Road; The road runs south-west as Dalrymple Road (State Route 93)
Heatley, Vincent, Garbutt tripoint	2.1	1.3	Douglas–Garbutt Road (Duckworth Street) – north – Garbutt (Nathan Street) – south – Vincent, Heatley	Road continues southwest.
Kirwan, Mount Louisa midpoint	4.3	2.7	Dalrymple Road – west – Kirwan, Mount Louisa	Road turns south as Thuringowa Drive.
Kirwan / Thuringowa Central midpoint	7.9	4.9	Hervey Range Developmental Road – southwest – Bohle Plains; Ross River Road – northeast – Cranbrook	Name changes to Riverway Drive. Southern end of State Route 93. Road continues south.
Condon	8.9– 9.3	5.5– 5.8	Bruce Highway – west – Condon east – Douglas	Road continues south.
Kelso	18.7	11.6	Riverway Drive – south – Ross River Dam; Kelso Drive – west – Kelso	Southern end of Garbutt–Upper Ross Road.
1.000 mi = 1.609 km; 1.000 km = 0.621 mi: Route transition

== North Townsville Road ==
North Townsville Road
- Location: Bruce Highway, Deeragun / Mount Low to Townsville Port Road, South Townsville
- Length: 19.4 km (12.1 mi)
- Route number: 14

North Townsville Road is a state-controlled regional road (number 832). It runs from the Bruce Highway on the Deeragun / Mount Low midpoint to Townsville Port Road (Southern Port Road / Benwell Road) in South Townsville, a distance of 19.4 kilometres (12.1 mi).

The road starts at an intersection with the Bruce Highway on the Deeragun / Mount Low midpoint. It is signed as State Route 14. It runs south-east as a four-lane divided road, following the boundary between Deeragun and Mount Low, then between Deeragun and Burdell, then between Burdell and Shaw. After passing the exit to Shaw Road to the south-west it becomes known as Woolcock Street and crosses the Bohle River into the locality of Cosgrove. It passes the exit to Ingham Road to the north-east and then turns east.

Continuing east the road passes through Cosgrove and Mount Louisa to Garbutt. It passes the exits to Douglas–Garbutt Road (Duckworth Street) to the south, and Garbutt–Upper Ross Road (Dalrymple Road) to the south-west. It runs between Garbutt and Currajong until it passes the exit to North Ward Road (Hugh Street) to the north-east. It then runs between Currajong and West End, then between West End and Pimlico, then between West End and Hyde Park before passing the exit to Townsville Connection Road (Charters Towers Road) to the south-west. The road next runs between West End and Hermit Park before crossing Ross Creek into Railway Estate, where it turns north-east.

The road continues north-east as Boundary Street, passing exits to South Townsville Road (Railway Avenue) to the south, and North Ward Road (Saunders Street) to the north. It enters South Townsville as a two-lane street, and continues to an intersection with Townsville Port Road, known locally as Southern Port Road (to south) and Benwell Road (to north), where it ends.

=== Major intersections (North Townsville Road) ===
All distances are from Google Maps. The entire road is within the Townsville local government area.

Location	km	mi	Destinations	Notes
Deeragun / Mount Low midpoint	0	0.0	Bruce Highway – south – Bohle Plains – northwest – Black River	Western end of North Townsville Road. Road runs southeast as State Route 14.
Burdell / Shaw midpoint	5.4	3.4	Shaw Road – southwest – Shaw, Bohle Plains	Name changes to Woolcock Street. Road continues southeast.
Cosgrove	6.2	3.9	Ingham Road – northeast – Mount Louisa	Road continues east.
Garbutt	11.5	7.1	Douglas–Garbutt Road (Duckworth Street) – south – Heatley, Vincent	Road continues east. Duckworth Street continues north to Ingham Road.
Garbutt / Currajong midpoint	13.1	8.1	Garbutt–Upper Ross Road (Dalrymple Road) – southwest – Heatley	Road continues east.
Garbutt / Currajong / West End tripoint	13.8	8.6	North Ward Road (Hugh Street) – northeast – Belgian Gardens	Road continues east. Hugh Street continues south to Currajong.
Hyde Park / Hermit Park / West End tripoint	16.2	10.1	Townsville Connection Road (Charters Towers Road) – southwest – Hyde Park	Road continues east. Name changes to Boundary Road. Charters Towers Road continues north-east.
Railway Estate	17.2	10.7	South Townsville Road (Railway Avenue) – south – Oonoonba; North Ward Road (Saunders Street) – north – Townsville City, North Ward	Road continues northeast.
South Townsville	19.4	12.1	Townsville Port Road (Benwell Road) – north – Townsville Port (Southern Port Road) – south – Stuart	Eastern end of North Townsville Road.
1.000 mi = 1.609 km; 1.000 km = 0.621 mi: Route transition

== North Ward Road ==
North Ward Road
- Location: North Townsville Road (Woolcock Street), Garbutt / Currajong / West End to North Townsville Road (Boundary Street), Railway Estate (via North Ward)
- Length: 7.9 km (4.9 mi)
- Route number: 16

North Ward Road is a state-controlled district road (number 833), part of which is rated as a local road of regional significance (LRRS). It runs from North Townsville Road (Woolcock Street) on the Garbutt / Currajong / West End tripoint to North Townsville Road (Boundary Street) in Railway Estate, via North Ward, a distance of 7.9 kilometres (4.9 mi).

The road starts at an intersection with North Townsville Road (Woolcock Street) on the Garbutt / Currajong / West End tripoint. It is signed as State Route 16. It runs north-east as Hugh Street, a four-lane divided road, crossing Ingham Road. State Route 16 continues south on Hugh Street. After changing its name to Percy Street and running inside the western boundary of West End the road again changes its name to Bundock Street. It then enters Belgian Gardens, where it curves to the east.

After entering North Ward the road turns south-east as Warburton Street. At an intersection with Gregory Street the name changes to Eyre Street, and at a roundabout intersection with Oxley Street it changes to Denham Street. The road runs south until it enters the locality of Townsville City, where it again turns south-east, passing the exit to Sturt Street to the south-west. Next it crosses Flinders Street and then Ross Creek, where it briefly enters South Townsville as Dean Street before turning south-west into Railway Estate as Saunders Street. Again turning south the road ends at an intersection with North Townsville Road (Boundary Street) in Railway Estate. State Route 16 continues south on South Townsville Road (Railway Avenue).

=== Major intersections (North Ward Road) ===
All distances are from Google Maps. The entire road is within the Townsville local government area.

Location	km	mi	Destinations	Notes
Garbutt, Currajong, West End tripoint	0	0.0	North Townsville Road (Woolcock Street) – west – Garbutt, Currajong – east – West End, Currajong; Hugh Street – south – Currajong	Western end of North Ward Road; The road runs northeast as Hugh Street (State Route 16)
Garbutt / West End midpoint	0.45	0.28	Ingham Road – west – Garbutt – east – West End	Road continues northeast
North Ward	5.3	3.3	Gregory Street – northeast – The Strand (Townsville waterfront) – southwest – North Ward, Castle Hill	Name changes from Warburton Street to Eyre Street. Road continues southeast.
Townsville City	6.1	3.8	Sturt Street – southwest – West End	Road continues southeast
Railway Estate	7.9	4.9	North Townsville Road (Boundary Street) – west – Hyde Park – east – South Townsville; South Townsville Road (Railway Avenue) – south – Oonoonba	Eastern end of North Ward Road.
1.000 mi = 1.609 km; 1.000 km = 0.621 mi: Route transition

== Ross River Road ==
Ross River Road is a state-controlled district road (number 612). It runs from Townsville Connection Road (Bowen Road / Charters Towers Road) in Mundingburra to Garbutt–Upper Ross Road (Thuringowa Drive / Riverway Drive) in Kirwan.

== Shaw Road ==
Shaw Road
- Location: Bruce Highway, Bohle Plains / Shaw to North Townsville Road, Shaw / Burdell
- Length: 4.7 km (2.9 mi)

Shaw Road is a state-controlled district road (number J41). It runs from the Bruce Highway on the Bohle Plains / Shaw midpoint to North Townsville Road on the Shaw / Burdell midpoint, a distance of 4.7 kilometres (2.9 mi).

The road starts at an intersection with the Bruce Highway at the Bohle Plains / Shaw midpoint. It runs north through the locality of Shaw as a two-lane road, crossing Dalrymple Road before veering north-east, north-west, and north-east again. It ends at an intersection with North Townsville Road on the Shaw / Burdell midpoint. Its only major intersection is with Dalrymple Road.

== South Townsville Road ==
South Townsville Road
- Location: Bruce Highway, Cluden to North Townsville Road (Boundary Street), Railway Estate
- Length: 6.4 km (4.0 mi)
- Route number: 16

South Townsville Road is a state-controlled regional road (number 831). It runs from the Bruce Highway in Cluden to North Townsville Road (Boundary Street) in Railway Estate, a distance of 6.4 kilometres (4.0 mi).

The road starts at an intersection with the Bruce Highway in Cluden. It runs north-west as Abbott Street (State Route 16), primarily a two-lane road, passing between Cluden and Idalia, then between Oonoonba and Idalia, before passing through the northern part of Oonoonba, where it turns north-east and crosses the Ross River. Here it enters Railway Estate and becomes Railway Avenue, primarily a four-lane divided road. It continues north to an intersection with North Townsville Road (Boundary Street) in Railway Estate, where it ends, while State Route 16 continues north-east on North Ward Road (Saunders Street). The road has no major intersections.

== Townsville Connection Road ==
Townsville Connection Road
- Location: Flinders Highway, Stuart to North Townsville Road (Woolcock Street), West End
- Length: 9.9 km (6.2 mi)
- Route number: 17

Townsville Connection Road is a state-controlled district road (number 830), part of which is rated as a local road of regional significance (LRRS). It runs from the Flinders Highway in Stuart to North Townsville Road (Woolcock Street) in West End, a distance of 9.9 kilometres (6.2 mi).

The road starts at an intersection with the Flinders Highway in Stuart. It runs north-west as Stuart Drive (State Route 17), primarily a two-lane road. From Stuart it runs through Wulguru, then between Wulguru and Cluden before crossing the Bruce Highway. Next it runs between Idalia and Annandale before crossing the Ross River into Rosslea, where it changes name to Bowen Road and becomes a four-lane divided carriageway. It then passes between Mundingburra and Hermit Park before reaching an intersection with Ross River Road.

Turning north-east as Charters Towers Road, it passes between Hermit Park and Mysterton, then between Hermit Park and Hyde Park, reaching an intersection with North Townsville Road (Woolcock Street), where it ends, while Charters Towers Road continues to the north-east with no route number. The road's only major intersections are with the Bruce Highway and with Ross River Road.

=== Stuart Drive upgrade ===
A project to upgrade a 2 kilometres (1.2 mi) section of Stuart Drive to four lanes, at a cost of $46.4 million, was expected to commence construction in mid-2023.

== Townsville Port Road ==
Townsville Port Road
- Location: Bruce Highway and Flinders Highway, Stuart to Townsville Port, South Townsville
- Length: 7.8 km (4.8 mi)

Townsville Port Road is a state-controlled national road (number 841). It runs from the Bruce Highway and Flinders Highway in Stuart to the Townsville Port in South Townsville, a distance of 7.8 kilometres (4.8 mi).

The road starts at an intersection with the Bruce Highway and the Flinders Highway in Stuart. It runs north as Southern Port Road, a two-lane carriageway, passing through Stuart and a small section of Cluden before turning north-west and crossing the Ross River into South Townsville. It passes the exit to North Townsville Road (Boundary Street) and turns north-east as Benwell Road. It reaches an intersection with Archer Street, where it ends, while Benwell Road continues into the Port area. The road's only major intersection is with North Townsville Road.

== See also ==
- List of road routes in Queensland
- List of numbered roads in Queensland
- Wikipedia:WikiProject Highways/Rockland County Scenario
