= Cathedral School, Townsville =

The Cathedral School, Townsville

Location
- Townsville, Queensland; Australia
- Coordinates: 19°17′50″S 146°46′42″E

Information
- Other name: The Cathedral School of St Anne & St James
- Type: Independent co-educational early learning, primary and secondary day and boarding school
- Motto: Latin: Talium Dei Regnum (Children represent the kingdom of God (Matthew 19:14))
- Denomination: Anglican
- Established: 1917; 109 years ago
- Principal: Luke Baills
- Staff: 260
- Years: Prep–12
- Enrolment: 1,050
- Colours: Navy blue, brown and white
- Slogan: Educating for life-long success
- Website: www.cathedral.qld.edu.au

The Cathedral School, Townsville, officially The Cathedral School of St Anne and St James, is an independent Anglican co-educational early learning, primary and secondary day and boarding school, located in the Townsville suburb of Mundingburra, Queensland, Australia. The incumbent principal is Mr. Luke Baills, serving in this role since 1 February 2024 after ten years as the head of Junior School.

Established in 1917, the school caters for children through early learning to Prep through to Year 12, with boarding students from Year 7 to Year 12. It is the only independent Anglican school in Townsville, becoming separately incorporated from the Anglican Diocese of North Queensland in 2000.

== History ==
The School was established in 1917 as St Anne's, a girls' school operated by the Sisters of the Society of the Sacred Advent. The original school operated in the Synod Hall adjacent to St James Cathedral, but soon moved to its own premises on the site which is now occupied by the Townsville City Council (Walker Street).

During World War II the school was acquired by the Australian Military for use as barracks accommodation for the Women's Auxiliary Australian Air Force (WAAAF) of No. 3 Fighter Sector RAAF. The school's students were evacuated to Ravenswood until the WAAAF finished using the premises in 1944/45.

The school moved to its current premises in Mundingburra in 1958. Over the next 20 years, the school settled into its new site and built a number of new buildings to service both boarders and day students.

In 1979, the school became co-educational and its first principal, Mr. Neil Tucker was appointed.

In 1985 the new Music and Drama centre was opened while a year later the new Technical Art's building was finished. Two years later, In 1988 the new Akins boy's dormitory was opened. In 2001 a major works project was undertaken and resulted in the redevelopment of the senior school precinct and the building of the Nancy Armati Quadrangle and SSA (Sisters of the Sacred Advent) Block consisting of ten new air conditioned classrooms and computer laboratories. These buildings were opened in 2002.

In 2006 work started on a purpose-built facility for young children, now known as the Early Learning Center (ELC) the building was finished in 2007 and accommodates all pre-prep students. Soon after the completion of the ELC work began on an expansion of Akins dormitory to replace the two existing boys dormitories. This work was completed shortly before the commencement of the 2008 year and has allowed all boys to be housed in a single dormitory.

In 2011 a purpose-built Pre-Prep Centre with three classes opened in time for the school year and the girls' Boarding, Sister Frances Boarding House underwent a $3.8 million refurbishment and extension which opened in April 2011.

=== School motto ===
The School motto, "Talium Dei Regnum" is based on a phrase taken from Matthew 19:14, "But Jesus said, Suffer little children, and forbid them not, to come unto me: for of such is the kingdom of heaven." The motto translates to "Children represent the kingdom of God".

== School structure ==
=== Early learning centre ===
Established in 2006, the early learning centre accepts children from 6 weeks to kindergarten age. The centre emphasises learning through play and also operates a Queensland Approved Kindergarten Program.

=== Junior School (Prep–Year 6) ===
The Junior School has its own buildings on the campus and caters for children from Prep to Year 6. There is a strong focus on developing literacy, numeracy and ICT skills. In addition, students from Year 2 and up participate in the school's outdoor education program.

=== Middle School (Year 7–9) ===
Housed in its own building the Middle School was opened in 2006 and accommodates Years 7 through 9 in purpose-built classrooms. The building contains five classrooms for the use of all three grades as many middle school classes are held in senior school classrooms. The entire middle school building is covered by a Wi-Fi network and laptops are easily available for flexible use within classrooms.

The Middle Schooling Program at The Cathedral School represents an exciting and challenging opportunity for students, staff, the school, and wider community to deal more effectively with a broad range of issues confronting young adolescents in a dynamic and evolving modern world. While these issues are not necessarily new, traditionally, they have been addressed independently of one another and as a result the solutions and programs offered have been less effective.

=== Senior School (Year 10–12) ===
The Nancy Armati Quadrangle

The Senior School is set around the Nancy Armati Quadrangle which lies in the shadow of a 100+ year old rain tree. Within the senior school there are 6 science laboratories, 11 general purpose classrooms, three computer laboratories and a number of other subject specific rooms including Hospitality, Art and Graphics rooms. All the schools rooms are fully air-conditioned all are equipped with smartboards, projectors and multimedia systems.

The senior school is the home of the Feetham Information Services Centre (ISC) which services the Middle and Senior schools. The ISC houses a complete range of text and reference books for the school's curriculum and also houses large fiction and non-fiction sections. The ISC also keeps a collection of local newspapers for a period of three to four months after publishing and has a vertical file storage system for articles of importance or are related to the schools curriculum. The ISC also has access to hundreds of Australian and international newspapers stored in a digital format and articles can be retrieved on request. The Information services centre also has a large computer section which students can use to access the school's network in their free time or during some classes. A multimedia computer is also available for use and is configured for use with the schools digital cameras, a scanner and camcorders.

The senior school also houses the schools drama and music centre. The Green Hall, formerly the boarders' dining hall, and drama hall, is fitted with a stage, seating and the appropriate lighting and sound equipment. The centre also includes a number of rooms of varying sizes used for rehearsal and practise for various music groups and individuals. The main music room, the fishbowl (as it is affectionately known due to its large glass double-glazed windows), is a sound insulated room which allows for performance groups and individuals to practise within school hours without disturbing other students. Construction on the Rock Centre, finished in 2013. The centre is now an Air-conditioned sport centre as well as an assembly area. Drama classes now take place on the stage, to give a more practical feel.

The Sisters of the Sacred Advent block (The SSA building) is the main teaching block in the senior school and is used for a variety of classes from English and maths to geography and graphics. The building, built in 2002 houses 10 purpose built classrooms as well as a number of staff offices. Three of the rooms in the SSA building are fully equipped computer laboratories which can be used by classes that require computer usage. In December 2008 the new Science centre and a150 seat Lecture Theatre was completed.

Year 10 provides a broad-based foundation with students acquiring knowledge and skills across the eight Key Learning Areas. In the final two years of secondary school, students select the subjects that best suit their interests, abilities and career aspirations.

In addition, students are involved in physical, cultural and spiritual programs which help them develop and mature in mind, body and spirit.

In 2013 the refurbished Rock Centre was opened. It features a fully air-conditioned space for school assemblies and indoor sports such as Basketball and Netball. The centre also contains new state of the art audio visual equipment.

=== Boarding ===
The Cathedral School houses approximately 150 boarding students from different backgrounds, including those from rural families, coastal and island communities and overseas. Boys and girls from Year 7 to Year 12 are accommodated in separate dormitories. Male Boarders are housed in Akins House, located in the Northeastern corner of the campus, while female boarders are housed in two adjoining dormitories in the centre of the campus. Boarding students managed by a Director of Boarding who is assisted by a Head of Boys or Girls Boarding (respectively) The Head's residence adjoins boarding house which they manage. There are then Supervisors (normally uni students who can be past boarders or mature students) who also reside within each dorm and help support the students.

== Extracurricular activities ==
=== Outdoor education ===
All grades between 2 and 10 participate in the school's outdoor education program. The outdoor education program aim to develop skills in survival as well as be a practical application for many subjects including Biology, Geography, History, Mathematics and English. Outdoor Education "Camps" start at 2 days and go up to 10 days for Year 10. Students in Year 10 may learn to sail on the Queensland Sail Training Ship the South Passage. Unfortunately, this has been slated to change in the coming years as it has been deemed not economically viable by the school board.

=== Rugby union ===
Rugby Union at The Cathedral School is very popular amongst the male students. Every two years The Cathedral School present the opportunity for approximately 30–35 rugby players to attend the Rugby & Netball tour in England, Scotland, and Ireland. During the seasons when the tour is not upcoming, the First XV rugby squad compete against rugby schools touring from the British Isles.

== House system ==
Similar to most Australian Schools, The Cathedral School employs a House System. Every Student is assigned a house upon enrolment with siblings assigned to the same house. There are four houses which not only compete in inter-house sporting and theatrical activities, but also offer pastoral care services to each member of a student's respective house through the House Dean and other support staff. Houses compete against each other weekly in informal sporting events held during semester and at other organised carnivals including a Cross Country, Swimming Carnival and Athletics Carnival. There are also theatrical and various other activities in which houses compete. These include a Dramatic Play, Debating Competition, Choir and Instrumental Presentations and a Student-choreographed musical presentation known as the "Dance-icals". Recently, the school has added an Inter-house Maths Competition, which also contributes to the house shield. Over the period of an academic year points are awarded to each house based on their performance in all these events. The house with the most points at the end of the academic year in the Middle and Senior Schools receives the House Cup while the winning house in the Junior School receives a similar trophy.

=== Bede House ===
Motto: Judge us by our actions
Colours: red and blue
Mascot: Bear

=== Chatham House ===
Motto: I know that I can do it
Colours: gold and black
Mascot: Cheetah

=== Langton House ===
Motto: To serve is to reign
Colours: maroon and gold
Mascot: Lion
Langton House is named after, Stephen Langton who was a central figure in the 11th century dispute between King John of England and Pope Innocent III, which ultimately led to the issuing of Magna Carta in 1215. It is one of the school's original houses.

=== More House ===
Motto: On the wings of an Eagle
Colours: green and black
Mascot: Eagle
One of the founding houses, More House, is named after the lawyer and scholar, Thomas More, who was beheaded in 1535 after he refused to sign an Act of Supremacy declaring King Henry VIII Royal Supremacy to the Church of England.

== The Cathedral School Leo Club ==
The Cathedral School Leo Club is a community service group, part of Lions International's youth organization, Leos. The club participates in a number of community service activities and performs fundraising for charity organizations. The Cathedral School Leo Club also has close ties to Twin Cities Leo Club and Northern Suburbs Lions Club, the club's sponsoring lion club. Many past members of the club are now members of the Twin Cities Leo Club.

== Academic results ==
Year 12 Cohort Overall Position (OP) Results

	QCS Mean	OP 1 (% of students)	OP 1–5 (% of students)	OP 1–9 (% of students)
The Cathedral School 2004	136.2	4.87	28.01	51.14
State Average 2004	128.3	2.3	15.18	38.41
The Cathedral School 2006	Unknown	Unknown	31.8	57.97
State Average 2006	Unknown	Unknown	12	34
The Cathedral School 2007	Unknown	7.58	28.79	Unknown
State Average 2007	Unknown	2.54	17.03	Unknown

== See also ==
- List of boarding schools in Australia
- List of schools in Queensland
- List of Anglican schools in Australia
