= Gulliver, Queensland =

Gulliver Townsville, Queensland
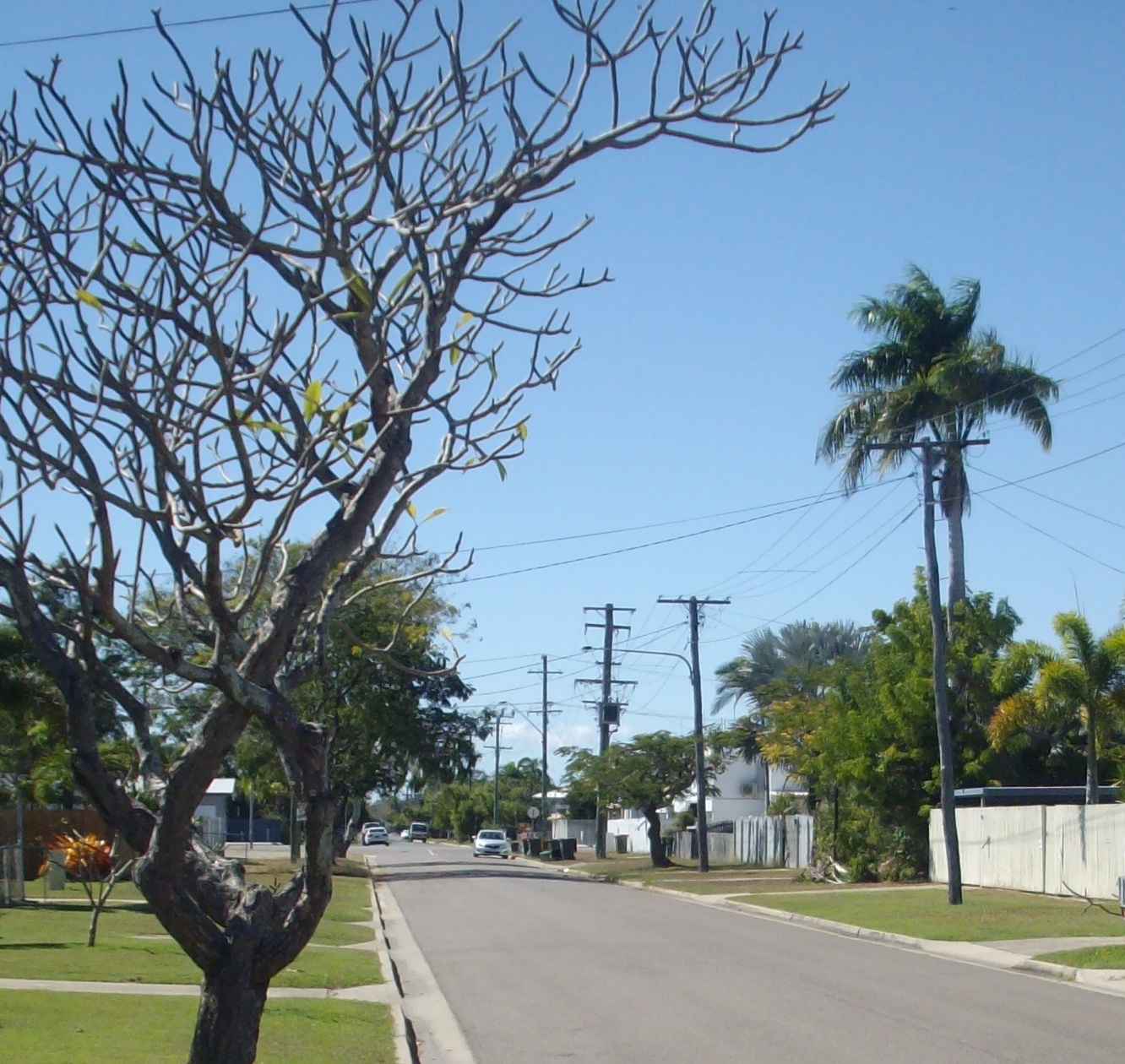
- McDonald Street, Gulliver

- Coordinates: 19.2869°S 146.7749°E
- Population: 2,884 (2021 census)
  - Density: 1,600/km^{2} (4,150/sq mi)
- Postcode(s): 4812
- Area: 1.8 km^{2} (0.7 sq mi)
- Time zone: AEST (UTC+10:00)
- Location: 7.1 km (4 mi) SW of Townsville CBD; 1,356 km (843 mi) NNW of Brisbane
- LGA(s): City of Townsville
- State electorate(s): Townsville; Mundingburra
- Federal division(s): Herbert
Suburbs around Gulliver:
Vincent	Currajong	Currajong
Vincent	Gulliver	Pimlico
Aitkenvale	Aitkenvale	Mundingburra

Gulliver is a suburb in the City of Townsville, Queensland, Australia. In the 2021 census, Gulliver had a population of 2,884 people.

== History ==
Gulliver is situated in the traditional Wulgurukaba Aboriginal country.

The suburb is named after Thomas Allen Gulliver, the telegraph master of Townsville.

It is unclear when the Holy Family Catholic Primary School opened in Gulliver, but it closed on 11 December 1987. It was then amalgamated with St John Fisher's Christian Brothers College (Currajong) and St Margaret Mary's Primary School (Hermit Park) to create The Marian School which opened on 21 January 1988 in Currajong. In 1995, St Mary's School (West End) was amalgamated into The Marian School.

Currajong State School opened on 28 June 1954.

Pimlico State High School opened on 27 January 1959.

== Demographics ==
In the 2016 census, Gulliver had a population of 2,825 people.

In the 2021 census, Gulliver had a population of 2,884 people.

== Education ==
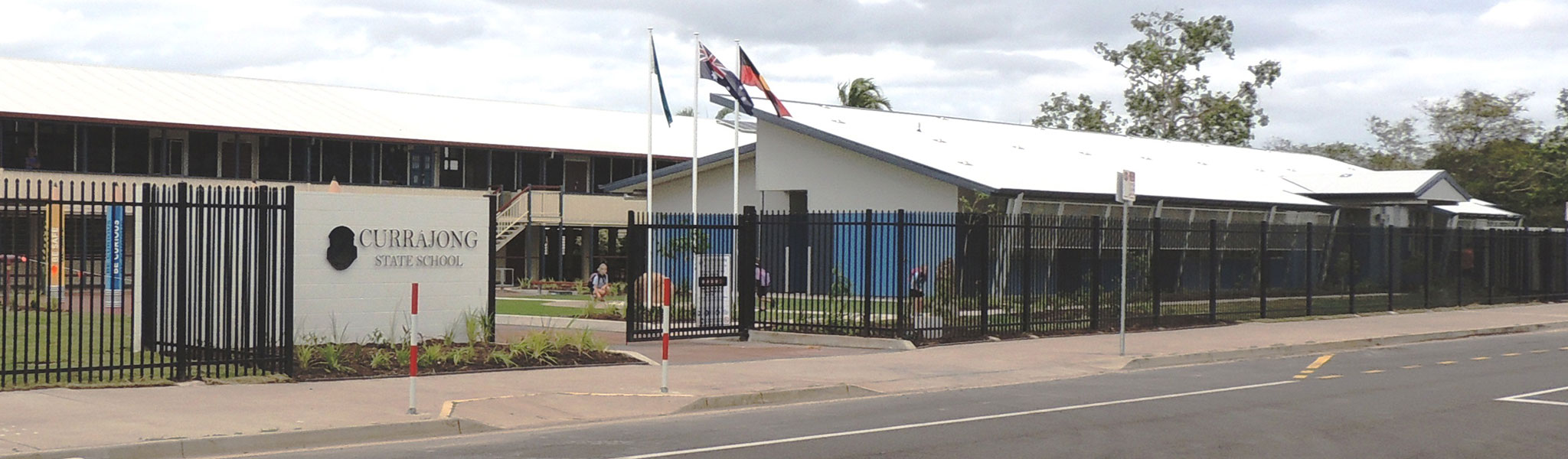
Currajong State School, 2025

Despite the name, Currajong State School is a government primary (Prep–6) school for boys and girls at 140 Palmerston Street in Gulliver, adjacent to Currajong's southern boundary (19.2802°S 146.7741°E). In 2018, the school had an enrolment of 602 students with 46 teachers (42 full-time equivalent) and 26 non-teaching staff (19 full-time equivalent). It includes a special education program.

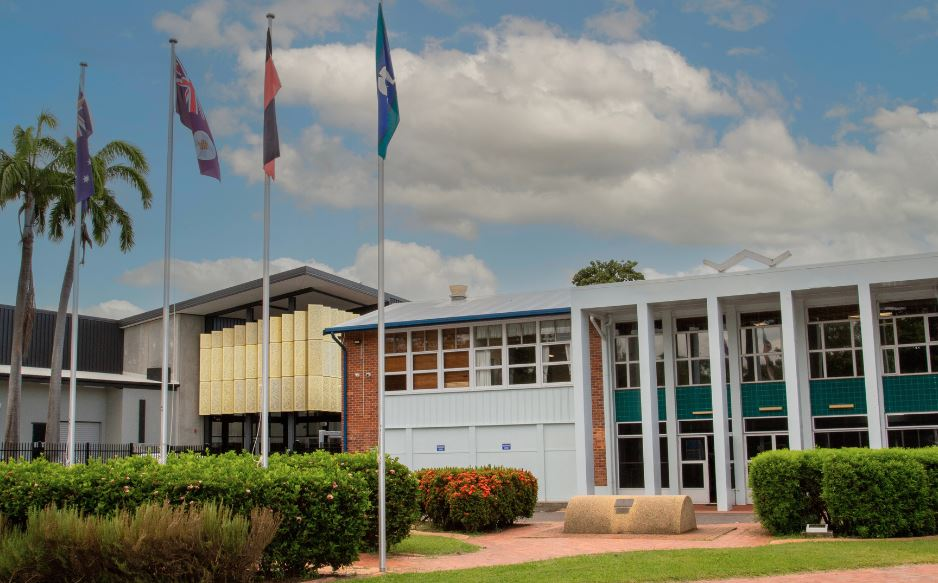
Pimlico State High School, 2025

Despite the name, Pimlico State High School is a government secondary (7–12) school for boys and girls on Fulham Road in Gulliver, adjacent to Pimlico's western boundary (19.2887°S 146.7826°E). In 2018, the school had an enrolment of 1,658 students with 136 teachers (127 full-time equivalent) and 56 non-teaching staff (42 full-time equivalent). It includes a special education program.

Queensland Pathways State College is at Desailly Street (19.2852°S 146.7805°E) within the TAFE Queensland campus. It is the Townsville campus of the secondary (10–12) Queensland Pathways State College which has its headquarters at Coorparoo in Brisbane. The school specialises in students who have difficulties with mainstream education.
