= Railway Estate, Queensland =

Railway Estate Townsville, Queensland
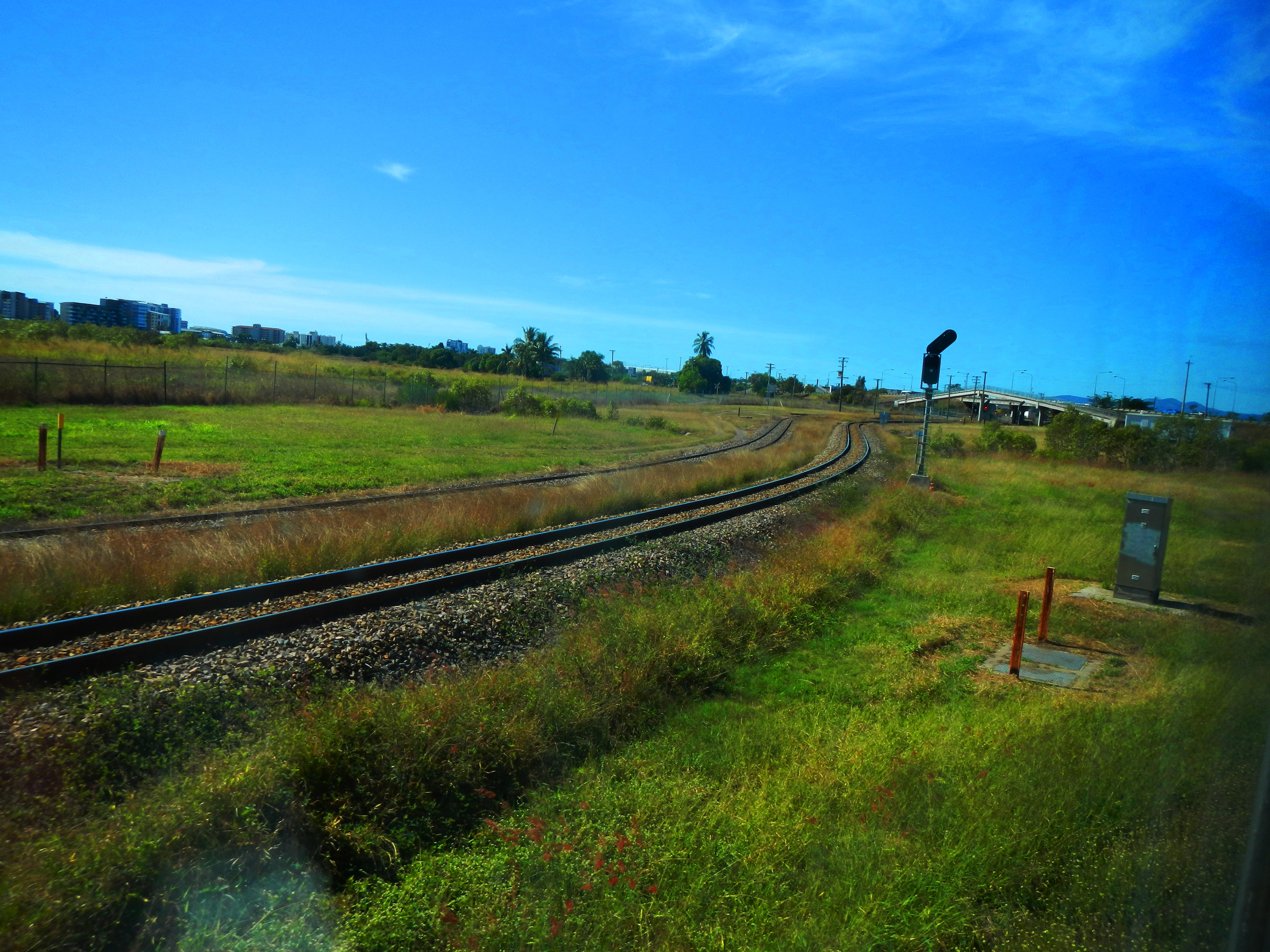
- View from The Inlander as it travels through Railway Estate, 2013

- Coordinates: 19.2780°S 146.8177°E
- Population: 2,871 (2021 census)
  - Density: 718/km^{2} (1,859/sq mi)
- Postcode(s): 4810
- Area: 4.0 km^{2} (1.5 sq mi)
- Time zone: AEST (UTC+10:00)
- Location: 3.4 km (2 mi) S of Townsville CBD; 1,329 km (826 mi) NNW of Brisbane
- LGA(s): City of Townsville
- State electorate(s): Townsville
- Federal division(s): Herbert
Suburbs around Railway Estate:
Townsville CBD	South Townsville	South Townsville
West End	Railway Estate	Stuart
Hermit Park	Oonoonba	Stuart

Railway Estate is a suburb of Townsville in the City of Townsville, Queensland, Australia. In the 2021 census, Railway Estate had a population of 2,871 people.

== Geography ==
Railway Estate is located on the south end of Ross Island, bounded by Ross Creek to the south-west and Ross River to the south-east. The suburb of South Townsville occupies the northern part of the island.

North Townsville Road (Boundary Street) runs through the suburb from west to east, North Ward Road (Saunders Street) enters from the north, and South Townsville Road (Railway Avenue) enters from the south-west.

There is a large railway yard in the north of the suburb with the North Coast railway line entering the suburb from the south (Oonoonba) over Ross River and then splits with one branch exiting the suburb to the north-west (Townsville CBD) over Ross Creek and the other exiting to the north (South Townsville) to the Port of Townsville. As at June 2025, there is only one operational railway station within the suburb:

- Wulguru Steel railway siding (19.26733°S 146.81999°E) on a spur off the North Coast railway line

but there were formerly a number of railway stations (from north to south):

- Railway Estate railway station (19.2723°S 146.8151°E)
- Queens Road railway station (19.2767°S 146.8155°E)
- Yenoor railway station (19.2812°S 146.8154°E)

Ross Island Barracks is a military facility in the east of the locality beside the Ross River. It is surrounded by marshland with Samphire Road being the only road access through the marshland. It has wharf access to the Ross River. Part of the 10th Force Support Battalion is located at the barracks.

The land use in the suburb is predominantly residential and community services.

== History ==
Close to the Townsville CBD and the Port of Townsville, Railway Estate is one of the oldest residential communities in the city. The suburb's name reflects that all the land was originally owned by the Queensland Railways Department.

Railway Estate State School opened on 21 August 1916.

Townsville State High School opened on 7 July 1924 in the Townsville Technical College in the Townsville CBD on the corner of Walker and Stanley Streets. The school had an initial enrolment of 55 students and eight staff. In 1954, there were 369 students. Lacking space to expand at the technical college, a new site was opened in 1964 in Boundary Street in Railway Estate with an intake of new Year 8 students while the existing students at the technical college transitioned to the new site in 1965.

== Demographics ==
In the 2011 census, Railway Estate had a population of 2,956 people.

In the 2016 census, Railway Estate had a population of 2,852 people.

In the 2021 census, Railway Estate had a population of 2,871 people.

== Education ==
Railway Estate State School is a government primary (Prep–6) school for boys and girls at 39 Railway Avenue (19.2742°S 146.8157°E). In 2018, the school had an enrolment of 219 students with 19 teachers (14 full-time equivalent) and 16 non-teaching staff (9 full-time equivalent).

Townsville State High School is a government secondary (7–12) school for boys and girls at 36 Boundary Street (19.2722°S 146.8105°E). In 2018, the school had an enrolment of 790 students with 73 teachers (70 full-time equivalent) and 43 non-teaching staff (32 full-time equivalent). It includes a special education program, an intensive English language program, and a positive learning centre (to assist students whose learning requires intervention beyond what is possible in a conventional classroom).

== Amenities ==
There are a number of parks in the suburb, including:

- Bicentennial Park (19.2826°S 146.8113°E)
- Dean Park (19.2647°S 146.8207°E)
- Lou Lister Park (19.2736°S 146.8080°E)
- National Park (19.2822°S 146.8250°E)
- Railway Estate Park (19.2745°S 146.8126°E)
- Reid Park (19.2717°S 146.8123°E)

There are a number of boating facilities, including:

- Ross River Marina, 3.8-hectare (9.4-acre) marina at the end of Samphire Road (19.2754°S 146.8298°E)
- a boat ramp into the Ross River (downstream) and pontoon at Barnicle Street (19.2802°S 146.8257°E) managed by the Townsville City Council
- a boat ramp into the Ross River (upstream) and floating walkway at Barnicle Street (19.2819°S 146.8250°E) managed by the Townsville City Council

There is also:

- Off-leash, fenced dog area next to boat ramp
- Council community gardens
