= Marian Catholic School (Currajong) =

Location
- Currajong, Townsville, Queensland; Australia; 19°16′36.73″S 146°46′54.2″E

Information
- Type: Independent co-educational primary school
- Religious affiliation: Roman Catholic Diocese of Townsville
- Denomination: Roman Catholic
- Established: 1988; 38 years ago
- Years: K–6
- Website: marian.catholic.edu.au

Marian Catholic School is an independent Roman Catholic co-educational primary school located in Currajong, a suburb of City of Townsville, Queensland, Australia. It currently has approximately 350 students and is administered by Catholic Education of the Roman Catholic Diocese of Townsville.

The school was formed in 1988 from the remnants of the former St John Fischer's School that was located on the current site of Marian Catholic School.

== See also ==
- List of schools in Queensland
