= Townsville City, Queensland =

Townsville City
- Suburb
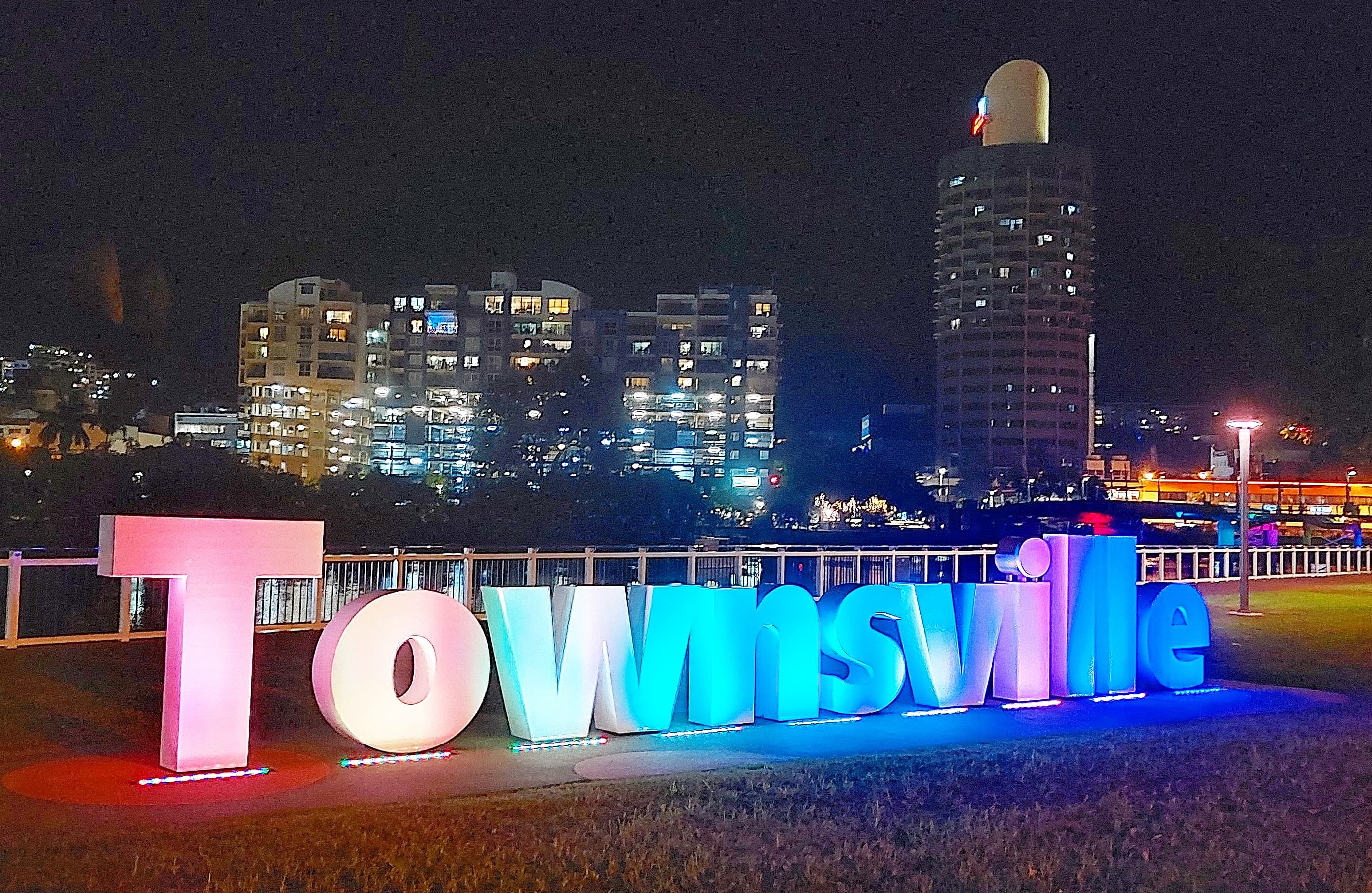
- Townsville City centre

- Interactive map of Townsville City
- Coordinates: 19.2622°S 146.8158°E
- Country: Australia
- State: Queensland
- City: Townsville
- LGA: City of Townsville
- Location: 347 km (216 mi) SSE of Cairns; 386 km (240 mi) NNW of Mackay; 718 km (446 mi) NNW of Rockhampton; 1,336 km (830 mi) NNW of Brisbane

Government
  - State electorate: Townsville
  - Federal division: Herbert

Area
  - Total: 2.0 km^{2} (0.77 sq mi)

Population
  - Total: 2,945 (2021 census)
  - Density: 1,470/km^{2} (3,810/sq mi)
- Time zone: UTC+10:00 (AEST)
- Postcode: 4810
Suburbs around Townsville City
North Ward	North Ward	Coral Sea
Castle Hill	Townsville City	South Townsville
West End	Railway Estate	South Townsville

Townsville City is a coastal suburb at the centre of the City of Townsville, Queensland, Australia. In the 2021 census, the suburb of Townsville City had a population of 2,945 people.

It is the city's central business district and a major hub for businesses of all sectors in the Northern Australia region.

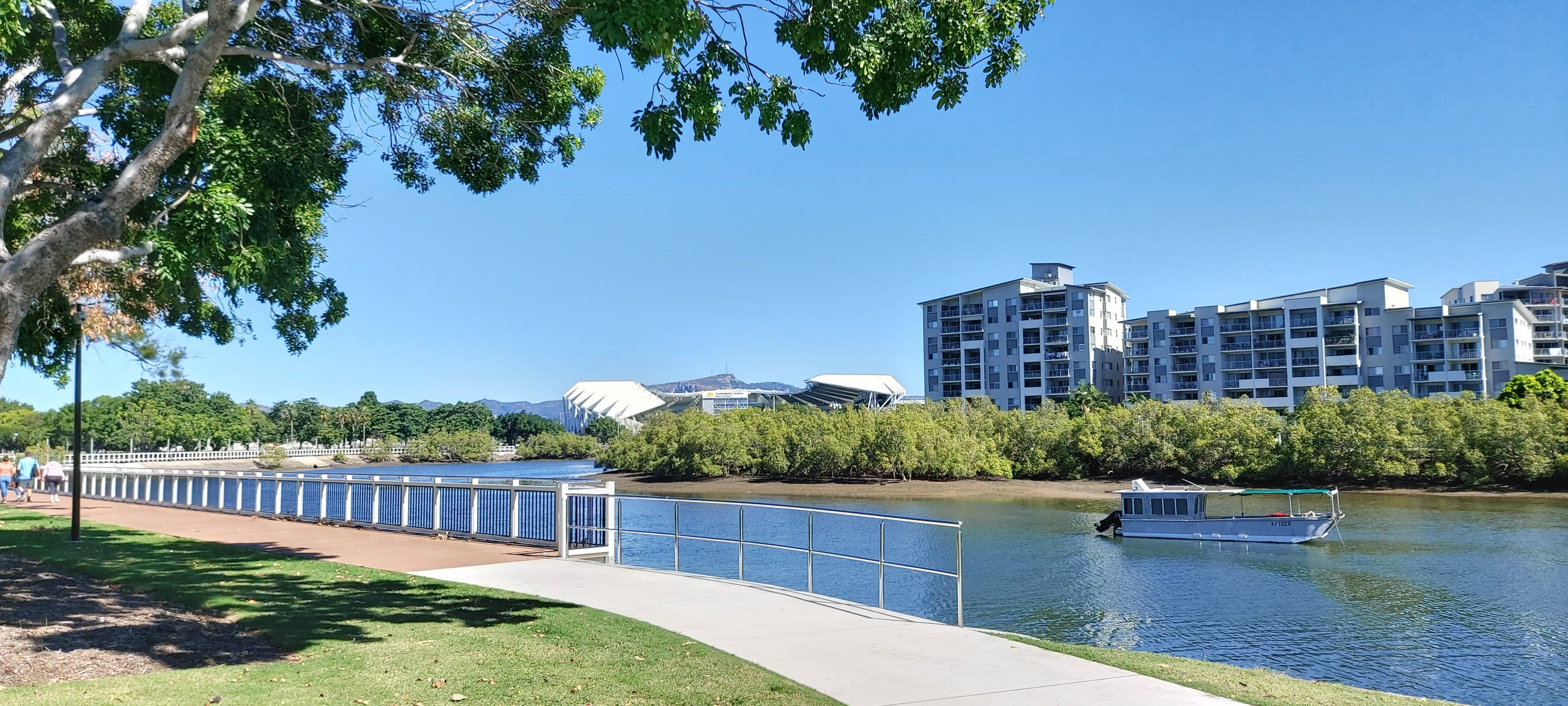
Waterfront in the CBD

== Geography ==
Townsville City is a strip of land along the northern-eastern bank of Ross Creek at its mouth at the Coral Sea, thus the suburb is bounded to the north by the Coral Sea and to the south-east by Ross Creek. It is overlooked to the west by Castle Hill. The land is mostly low-lying, just about sea level, apart from Melton Hill (19.2559°S 146.8189°E) which creates a natural boundary to North Ward to the north-west.

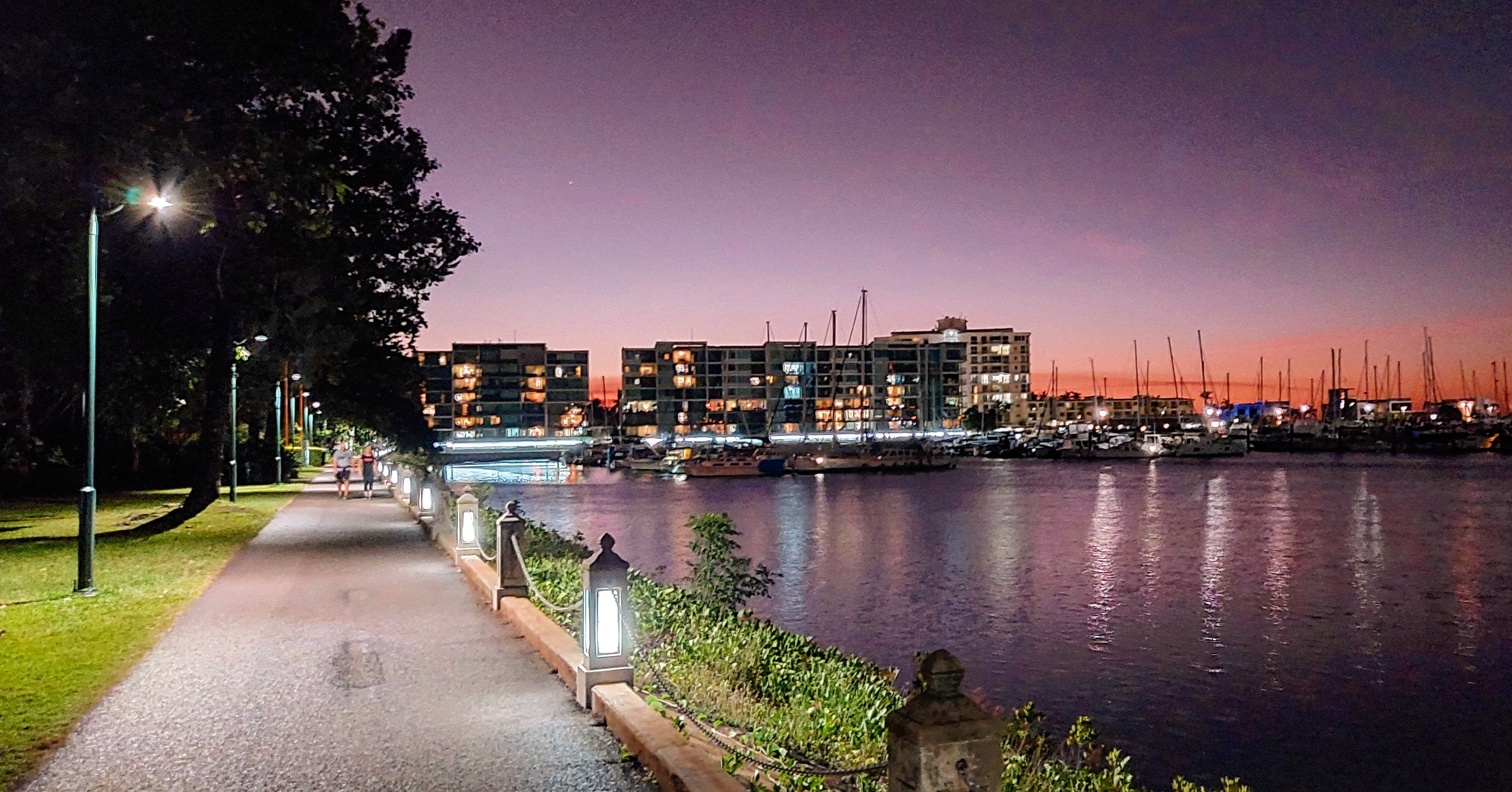
The Breakwater Marina

North Ward Road (Denham Street) runs through from north to south-east.

== History ==
Townsville City is situated in the traditional Wulgurukaba Aboriginal country.

Townsville City takes its name from Robert Towns, a merchant and entrepreneur, who was a pioneer financial supporter of pastoral development around the Ross River area.

Services of worship for members of the Baptist Church commenced in Townsville in January 1888 in rented premises. In 1891 the Townsville Baptist Church bought the land and two cottages (at the rear of the allotment) from the original landholder, Duncan McVean, for £500. At the time the allotment took up one half of the length of Fletcher Street between Sturt and Walker streets (19.2650°S 146.8099°E). In September 1893, a vacant Congregationalist church building in Denham Street and its contents were purchased and re-erected on the Sturt Street site. The first service was held on Thursday 23 November 1893. In January 1903 the building was damaged by Cyclone Leonta. What could be salvaged was used to erect a church hall. A building fund was set up for a new church and hall, but it was not until 1922 that a replacement church was built. Having insufficient funds for new bricks, a disused powder magazine, eight miles from Townsville at Brookhill and purchased and the congregation dismantled and cleaned around 30,000 bricks. In December 1921, tenders were called to erect a new brick church adjacent to the former church. The building contract was signed for £832/6/- and the foundation stone was laid on 8 July 1922. The new church opened on Saturday 23 September 1922. In 1981, the land and buildings were sold because the Townsville City Baptist Church and the Currajong Baptist Church were both too small, so the congregations decided to combine and bought a new property at Kirwan.

St Anne's Church of England Girls’ School opened on 1 January 1917 with an initial enrolment of 71 students in Walker Street (now occupied by the Townsville City Council centre, approx 19.2585°S 146.8145°E). It was operated by the Society of the Sacred Advent. From 1942 to 1945 during World War II when a Japanese invasion was feared, the school was evacuated to Ravenswood while the Women's Auxiliary Australian Air Force occupied the school's facilities in Townsville. In 1953, the need for expand results in the purchase of 23 acres (9.3 ha) of land in Mundingburra, where the foundation stone was laid in 1956. The Mundingburra site was officially opened on 13 April 1958 with the move to the new site taking place at the end of August 1958. Still Anglican, it is now a co-educational school known as the Cathedral School of St Anne and St James.

Townsville State High School opened on 7 July 1924 in the Townsville Technical College in the Townsville CBD on the corner of Walker and Stanley Streets. The school had an initial enrolment of 55 students and eight staff. In 1954, there were 369 students. Lacking space to expand at the technical college, a new site was opened in 1964 in Boundary Street in Railway Estate with an intake of new Year 8 students while the existing students at the technical college transitioned to the new site in 1965.

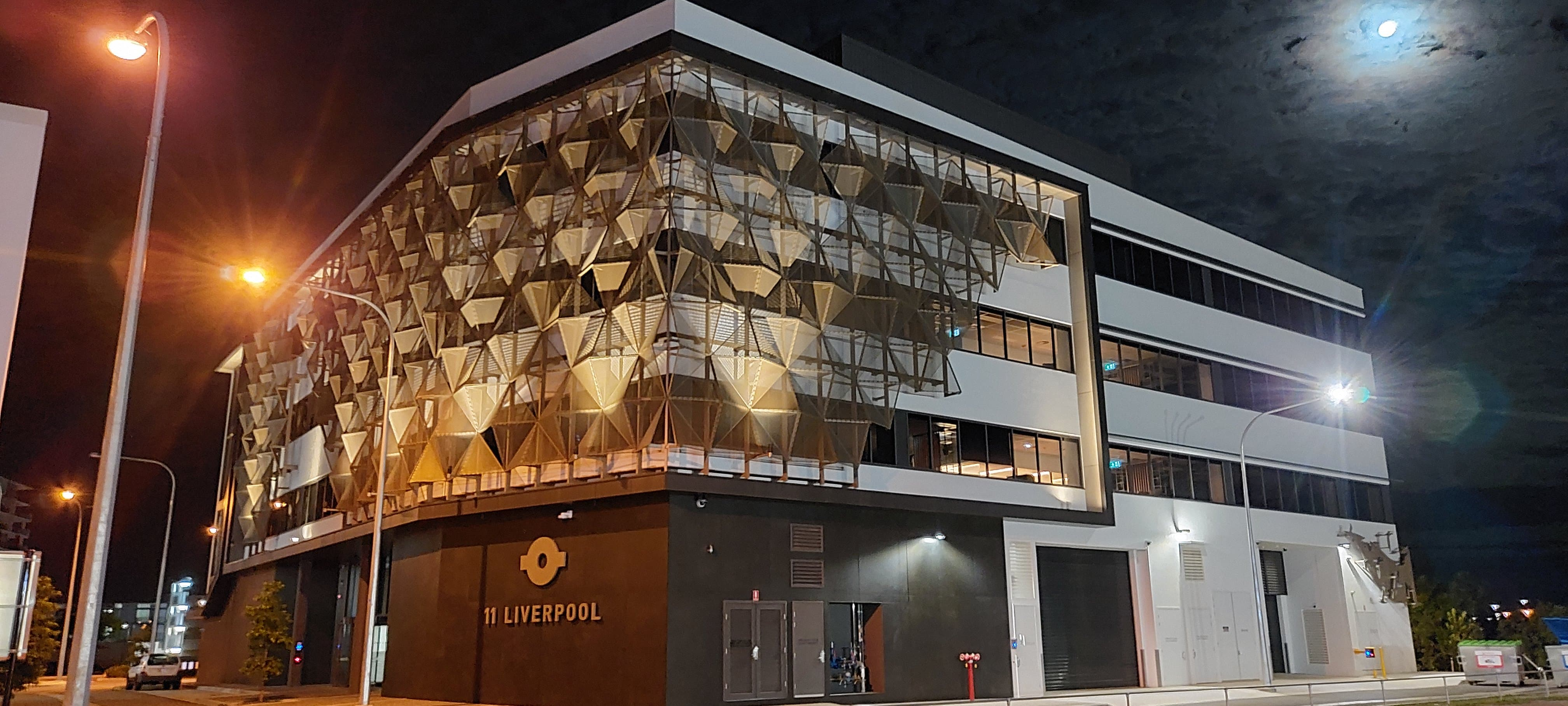
Australian Taxation Office Building Opened in 2020

== Demographics ==
In the 2011 census, the suburb of Townsville City had a population of 2,500 people.

In the 2016 census, the suburb of Townsville City had a population of 2,910 people.

In the 2021 census, the suburb of Townsville City had a population of 2,945 people.

== Built environment ==
The dominant land use in the Townsville CBD (Central Business District) is commercial but with a growing residential aspect. Office buildings include Northtown Office Tower, Verde Tower (Queensland State Government), 420 on Flinders (Ergon Energy and National Australia Bank, and Central Plaza (Drake International). Some companies that have offices in the CBD include Wilmar International, RID Insect Repellent, Suncorp Insurance, Adani Australia.

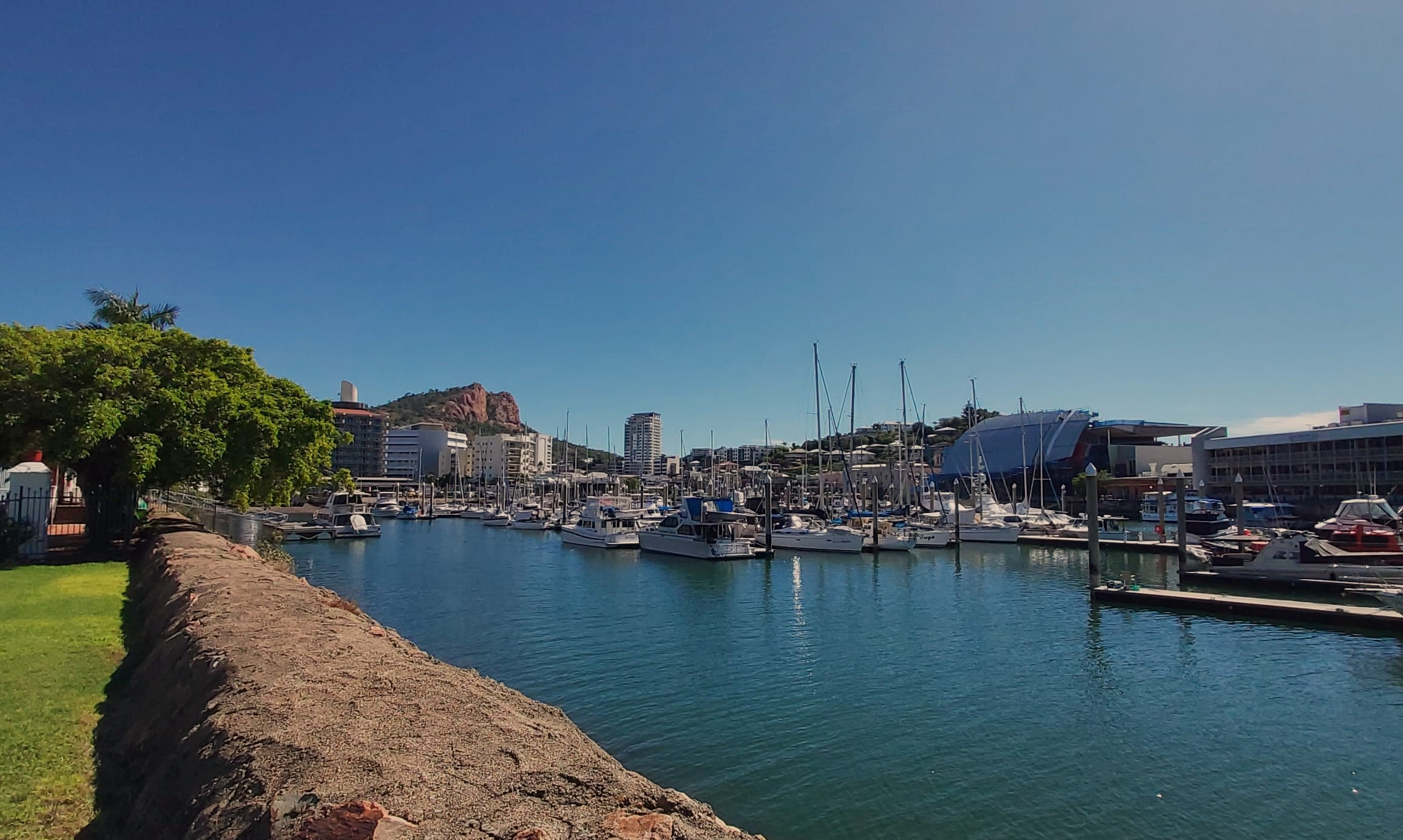
The Marina and Castle Hill

Townsville City is home to many regional offices of government organisations as well as many private companies, serving as a hub for northern Queensland. There has been extensive construction in the city centre over the last 20 years. As of 2020 some new projects include Flinders Lane, a new home for the Australian Taxation Office and recently completed is the Queensland Country Bank Stadium that opened 29 February 2020 with a concert by Elton John. In coming years new projects under construction will include new offices for the Great Barrier Reef Marine Park Authority, a new access stairway to Castle Hill, and completion of the Townsville Courthouse upgrade.

== Amenities ==
CityLibraries Townsville operates a public library at 280 Flinders Street.

Perc Tucker Gallery is at 253–259 Flinders Street. It exhibits a wide range of art, but with a special focus on North Queensland artists.

Saints Theodores Greek Orthodox Church is at 654 Sturt Street (19.2673°S 146.8071°E). Their feast day is the first Saturday of Lent.

== Education ==
There are no schools in the suburb. The nearest government primary schools are Townsville South State School in neighbouring South Townsville to the east, Townsville West State School in neighbouring West End to the south-west, and Townsville Central State School in neighbouring North Ward to the north-east. The nearest government secondary school is Townsville State High School in neighbouring Railway Estate to the south.

== Events ==
The Northern Australia Festival of Arts is held annually.

The Sunday Cotters Markets are held every Sunday in Flinders Street.

== Heritage listings ==
Townsville CBD has a large number of heritage-listed sites.
