= Pimlico State High School =

Coordinates: 19°17′20″S 146°47′15″E

Pimlico State School
- Townsville, Queensland; Australia

Information
- Type: Public
- Motto: Latin: Qui alios diligit, ipse diligitur (Those who respect others will in turn be respected.)
- Established: 1959
- Enrolment: Co-educational grades 7–12
- Campus: Pimlico
- Colours: Blue & white
- Website: https://pimlicoshs.eq.edu.au/

Pimlico State High School is a government public high school in Gulliver, Townsville, Queensland, Australia.

== Basic information ==
Established in 1959, Pimlico State High School is now one of the largest public high schools in North Queensland. Following the transition of Year 7 from primary schools to high schools across Queensland in 2015, the total enrolments of Pimlico have grown to approximately 1700. While operated as part of the Queensland Department of Education, Pimlico was awarded Independent Public School (IPS) status in 2013. Under the IPS program, Pimlico operates semi-autonomously with oversight provided by a School Council.

The school draws approximately half of its enrolments from outside its designated catchment area. Because of the strong demand for places at the school, Pimlico is designated as an 'enrolment managed' school and has an Enrolment Management Plan that sets the parameters for prioritising and accepting enrolments from outside of the school's catchment. Students can apply for enrolment as part of the school's Excellence Programs in Music, Performing Arts and Academics. The Pimlico Global education program is an organisation that allows students to build and grow relationships with their peers and kids from all over the world.

The school is accredited with the Council of International Schools (CIS).

The current head of school is Executive Principal, Steve "Basketball" Baskerville. The Executive Principal is supported by a Principal and four Deputy Principals and each of these senior leaders oversee a specific portfolio area within the school. A team of approximately fifteen Heads of Department lead different faculties or significant programs areas within the school. The majority of these Heads of Department lead curriculum-based faculty areas, such as Mathematics or The Arts, while a small number have responsibility for school-wide programs or initiatives such as Teaching and Learning or Student Development. There are approximately 120 teaching staff and 60 non-teaching staff at Pimlico. While the School Council provides broad strategic oversight, a Parents and Citizens Association provides further opportunities for parental input and involvement.

== Notable alumni ==
- Russell Baker AM – Commodore, Royal Australian Navy, President Mountain Bike Australia 2009–2017
- Jarrod Bannister – Australian representative to 2012 Olympics in Javelin
- John Buttigieg – North Queensland Cowboys / Queensland State of Origin Rugby League
- Harry Froling – basketball player/2019 NBL Rookie of the Year
- Mitchell Johnson – Australian Test/One Day & 20/20 Cricketer
- Kimberley Jenner – Netballer
- Luke Kennedy – Runner-up The Voice Australia Season 2 (2013)
- Mitch Norton – basketball player
- Aaron Payne – North Queensland Cowboys Rugby League
- Anna Reynolds – Lord Mayor of Hobart
- Milton Thaiday – NSW Waratahs Rugby Union & Newcastle Knights Rugby League
- Gorden Tallis – Former Captain of Brisbane Broncos / Queensland State of Origin / Australian National Rugby League Team (Kangaroos)
