= List of Townsville suburbs =

Suburbs and settlements of the City of Townsville in Queensland, Australia, listed relative to their historical local government area from prior to 2008 when City of Townsville and City of Thuringowa were separate local government areas, are as follows:

Greater Townsville

- Townsville City
- Aitkenvale
- Annandale
- Belgian Gardens
- Castle Hill
- Cluden
- Cosgrove
- Cranbrook
- Currajong
- Douglas^{1}
- Garbutt
- Gulliver
- Heatley
- Hermit Park
- Hyde Park
- Idalia
- Mount Louisa
- Mount St John
- Mount Stuart
- Mundingburra
- Murray^{2}
- Mysterton
- North Ward
- Oonoonba
- Pallarenda
- Pimlico
- Railway Estate
- Rosslea
- Rowes Bay
- South Townsville
- Stuart
- Town Common
- Townsville West
- Vincent
- West End
- Wulguru

Rural Townsville

- Alligator Creek
- Barringha
- Beach Holm (beach)
- Blue Hills
- Brookhill
- Calcium
- Cape Cleveland
- Clemant
- Crimea
- Crystal Creek
- Cungulla
- Granite Vale
- Gumlow
- Hervey Range
- Julago
- Lynam
- Majors Creek
- Mount Elliot
- Nome
- Oak Valley
- Partington
- Purono Park (beach)
- Rangewood
- Roseneath
- Ross River
- Rupertswood
- Stuart
- Toonpan
- Woodstock

Islands

- Orpheus Island
- Palm Island
- Magnetic Island
  - Arcadia
  - Florence Bay
  - Horseshoe Bay
  - Nelly Bay
  - Picnic Bay

Urban Thuringowa

- Alice River
- Bluewater (beach)
- Bohle
- Bohle Plains
- Bushland Beach (beach)
- Condon
- Deeragun (beach)
- Kelso
- Kirwan
- Pinnacles
- Rasmussen
- Thuringowa Central

Rural Thuringowa

- Balgal Beach
- Black River (beach)
- Bluewater Park
- Burdell (beach)
- Jensen (beach)
- Mount Low (beach)
- Mutarnee
- Paluma
- Rollingstone
- Saunders Beach (beach)
- Shaw
- Toolakea (beach)
- Toomulla
- Yabulu (beach)

^{1} - includes James Cook University
^{2} - includes Lavarack Barracks
