= Brookhill, Queensland =

Brookhill
- Suburb
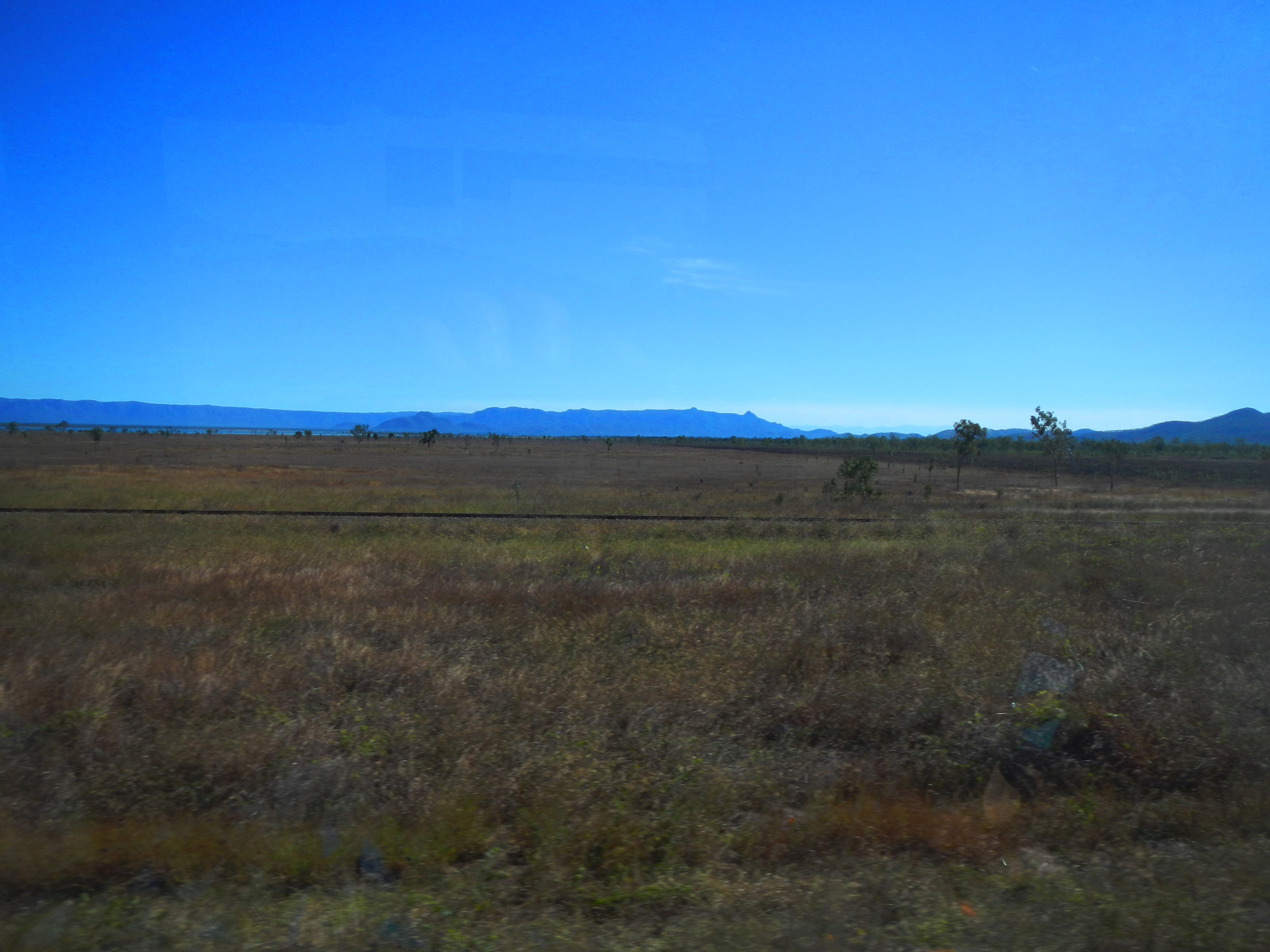
- Brookhill landscape, 2013

- Interactive map of Brookhill
- Coordinates: 19.4208°S 146.8658°E
- Country: Australia
- State: Queensland
- LGA: City of Townsville
- Location: 16.5 km (10.3 mi) SSE of Annandale; 21.9 km (13.6 mi) S of Townsville CBD; 1,360 km (850 mi) NNW of Brisbane

Government
  - State electorates: Burdekin; Mundingburra
  - Federal divisions: Kennedy; Dawson

Area
  - Total: 54.2 km^{2} (20.9 sq mi)

Population
  - Total: 88 (2021 census)
  - Density: 1.624/km^{2} (4.205/sq mi)
- Time zone: UTC+10:00 (AEST)
- Postcode: 4816
Suburbs around Brookhill
Roseneath	Stuart	Julago
Oak Valley	Brookhill	Alligator Creek
Ross River	Toonpan	Mount Elliot

Brookhill is a rural locality in the City of Townsville, Queensland, Australia. In the 2021 census, Brookhill had a population of 88 people.

== Geography ==
Brookhill is a valley between Mount Stuart (584 metres) and Mount Elliot (1218 metres). The Flinders Highway and the Great Northern Railway form the western boundary of the locality. The land use is predominantly grazing on native vegetation.

== History ==
The locality was named and bounded on 27 July 1991.

== Demographics ==
In the 2016 census, Brookhill had a population of 76 people.

In the 2021 census, Brookhill had a population of 88 people.

== Education ==
There are no schools in Brookhill. The nearest government primary school is Wulguru State School in Wulguru to the north-west. The nearest government secondary school is William Ross State High School in Annandale to the north-west.
