= Julago, Queensland =

Julago
- Suburb
- Interactive map of Julago
- Coordinates: 19.3730°S 146.8819°E
- Country: Australia
- State: Queensland
- LGA: City of Townsville
- Location: 11.0 km (6.8 mi) SE of Wulguru; 13.2 km (8.2 mi) SE of Annandale; 16.6 km (10.3 mi) SSE of Townsville CBD; 1,343 km (835 mi) NNW of Brisbane

Government
  - State electorate: Burdekin
  - Federal divisions: Dawson; Kennedy

Area
  - Total: 23.6 km^{2} (9.1 sq mi)

Population
  - Total: 384 (2021 census)
  - Density: 16.27/km^{2} (42.14/sq mi)
- Time zone: UTC+10:00 (AEST)
- Postcode: 4816
Suburbs around Julago
Stuart	Stuart	Nome
Stuart	Julago	Nome
Brookhill	Alligator Creek	Alligator Creek

Julago is a rural locality in the City of Townsville, Queensland, Australia. It will be the site of a large masterplanned real estate development in the years ahead. In the 2021 census, Julago had a population of 384 people.

== Geography ==
The northern part of the locality is mountainous and mostly undeveloped bushland. The highest peak is Mount Muntalunga (19.3456°S 146.8811°E) which rises 228 metres (748 ft) above sea level and is part of the Muntalunga Range. There is also an unnamed peak (19.36529°S 146.88196°E) rising to 200 metres (660 ft). Between these two mountains is a valley (40 meters above sea level).

The Bruce Highway enters the locality from the east (Alligator Creek / Nome), passes through the valley, exiting the locality to the north-west (Stuart). The North Coast railway line enters the locality from the north-east (Nome), passes through the valley to the north of the highway, and exits to the north-west (Stuart).

Most of the housing in the locality is in this valley, easily accessed from the highway. The south part of the locality is used for grazing by the Rocky Springs station.

== History ==
The locality was named and bounded on 27 July 1991. The name comes from the Julago railway station, assigned by the Queensland Railways Department from 7 May 1942 (as part of a World War II emergency crossing loop). The name is reportedly an Aboriginal word, meaning plains turkey.

In November 2016, the Deputy Premier of Queensland, Jackie Trad, announced that Townsville's largest master-planned community would be built on the Rocky Springs Land in a new development called Elliot Springs. When completed in 2050 (estimated), the 1,609-hectare (3,980-acre) estate will have over 10,600 homes and over 26,000 residents. Trad committed the Queensland Government to spend $15M on water and road infrastructure as part of co-investment with property developer Lendlease. The name Elliot Springs reflects that Mount Elliot will be the backdrop to the new development, which will also have views of Mount Jack, Mount Stuart and the Muntalunga Ranges.

LendLease expect the first display village with homes constructed by 13 building companies will open in January 2019.

== Demographics ==
In the 2016 census, Julago had a population of 113 people.

In the 2021 census, Julago had a population of 384 people.

== Education ==
There are no schools in Julago. The nearest government primary school is Wulguru State School in Wulguru to the north-west. The nearest government secondary school is William Ross State High School in Annandale to the north-west.

== Amenities ==
Elliot Spring Wesleyan Methodist Church meets at the Elliot Springs Community Centre on Elliot Springs Boulevard (approx 19.3750°S 146.8978°E). It is part of the Wesleyan Methodist Church.
