= Roseneath, Queensland =

Roseneath
- Suburb
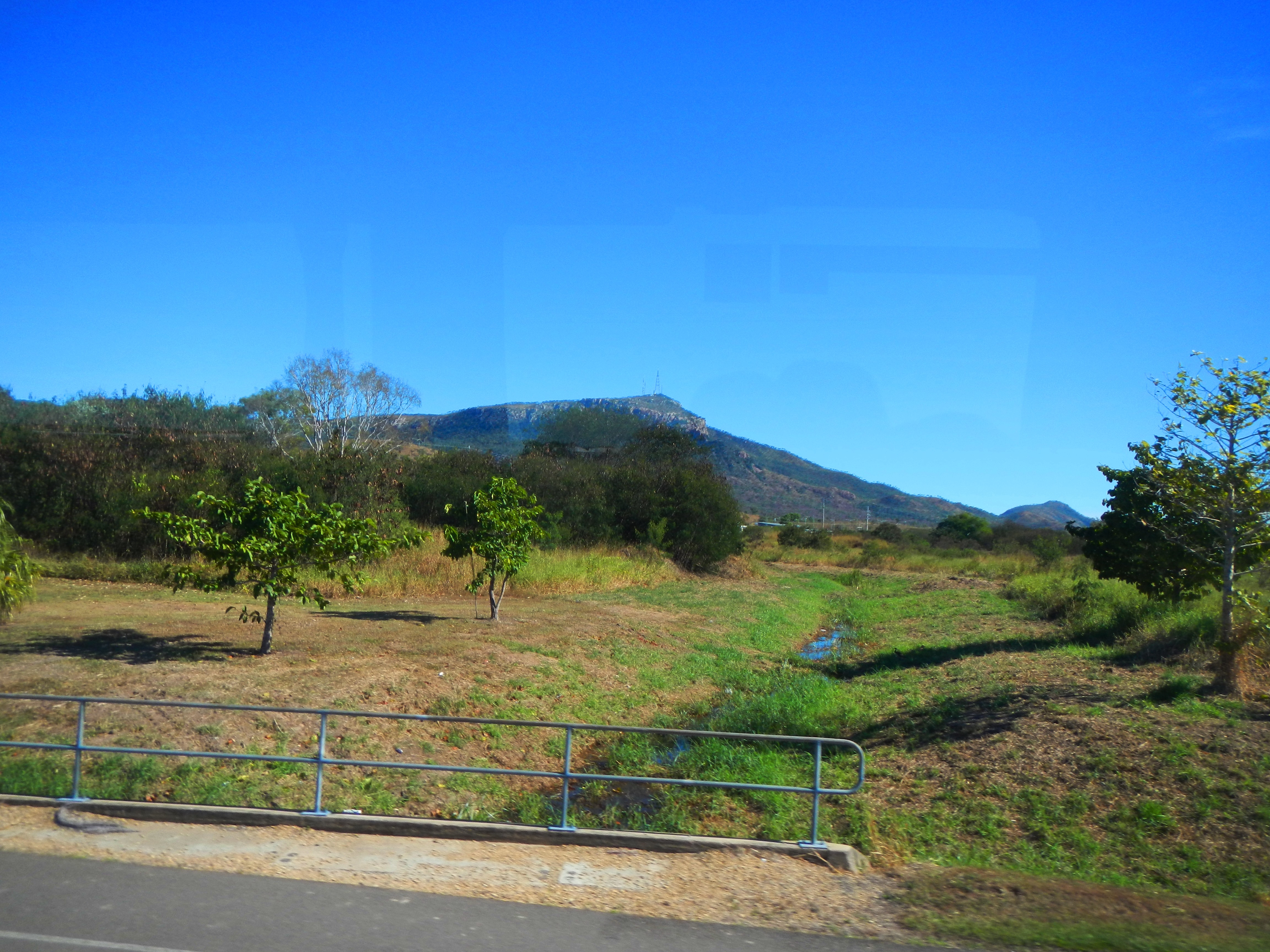
- Looking across Roseneath towards Mount Stuart, 2013

- Interactive map of Roseneath
- Coordinates: 19.3566°S 146.8238°E
- Country: Australia
- State: Queensland
- City: Townsville
- LGA: City of Townsville
- Location: 8.7 km (5.4 mi) SW of Annandale; 13.8 km (8.6 mi) S of Townsville CBD; 1,356 km (843 mi) NNW of Brisbane

Government
  - State electorate: Mundingburra
  - Federal divisions: Kennedy; Dawson; Herbert

Area
  - Total: 11.4 km^{2} (4.4 sq mi)

Population
  - Total: 127 (2021 census)
  - Density: 11.14/km^{2} (28.85/sq mi)
- Postcode: 4811
Suburbs around Roseneath
Murray	Wulguru	Stuart
Mount Stuart	Roseneath	Stuart
Mount Stuart	Oak Valley	Brookhill

Roseneath is an outer suburb of Townsville in the City of Townsville, Queensland, Australia. In the 2021 census, Roseneath had a population of 127 people.

== Geography ==
Most of Roseneath forms the foothills of Mount Stuart and is mountainous terrain rising to unnamed peaks of up to 300 metres. It is mostly undeveloped bushland. The Flinders Highway (Stuart Drive) and the Great Northern Railway pass through the very eastern part of the locality (at times forming its boundary) which is the base of the mountain (about 30 metres above sea level) near to Stuart Creek (which forms part of the eastern boundary of the locality). The small residential area is mostly located east of the highway and railway beside Stuart Creek but there are a small number of the homes immediately to the west of the highway and railway.

== History ==
The suburb named and bounded on 12 June 1992. The name is believed to be a local pastoral property name before the Great Northern Railway was built in 1880.

== Demographics ==
In the 2016 census, Roseneath had a population of 154 people.

In the 2021 census, Roseneath had a population of 127 people.

== Education ==
There are no schools in Roseneath. The nearest government primary school is Wulguru State School in neighbouring Wulguru to the north. The nearest government secondary school is William Ross State High School in Annandale to the north-west.
