= Alligator Creek, Queensland (Townsville) =

Alligator Creek
- Suburb
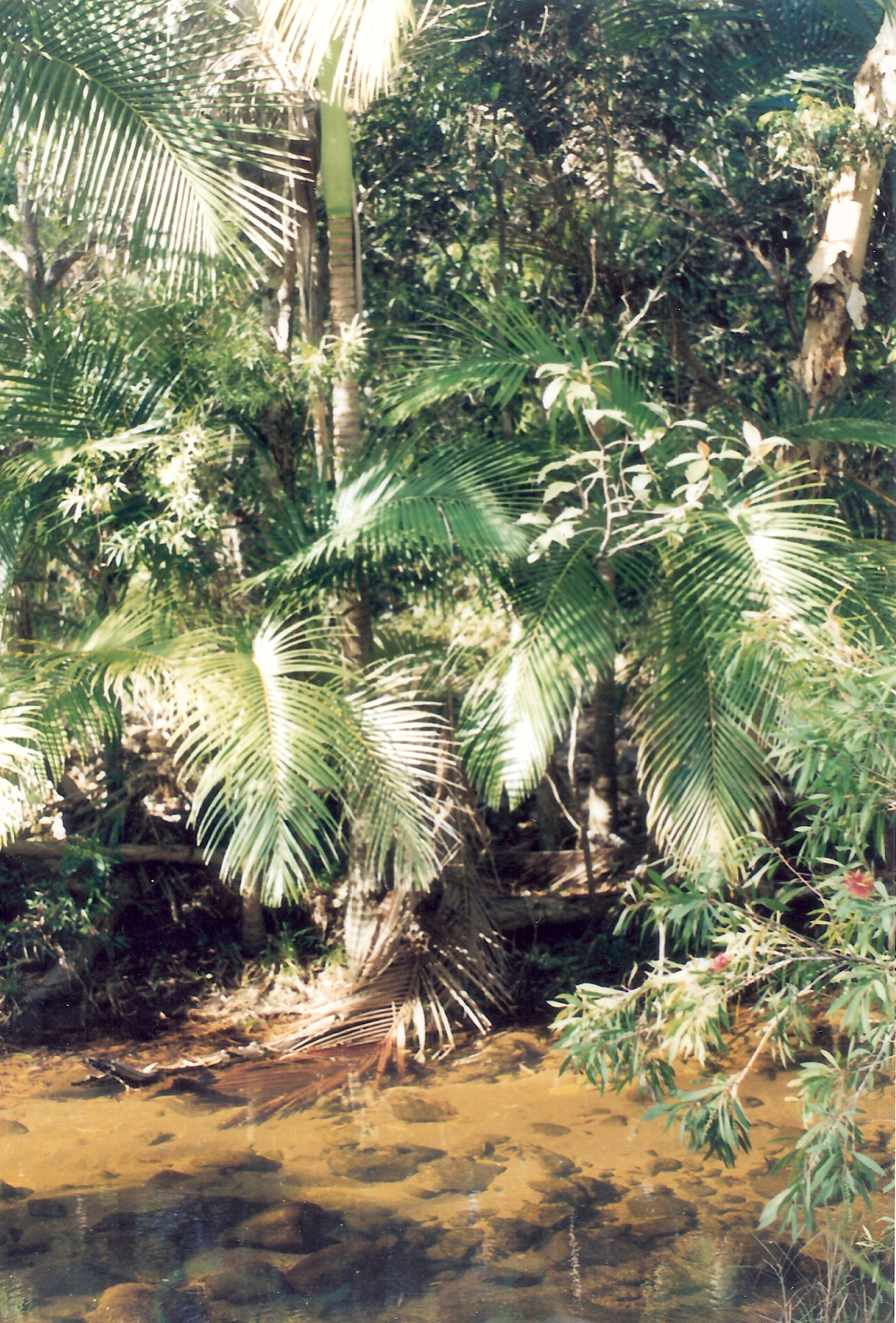
- Alligator Creek

- Interactive map of Alligator Creek
- Coordinates: 19.4241°S 146.9458°E
- Country: Australia
- State: Queensland
- LGA: City of Townsville
- Location: 24.1 km (15.0 mi) SE of Wulguru; 25.9 km (16.1 mi) SE of Annandale; 29.3 km (18.2 mi) SSE of Townsville CBD; 1,344 km (835 mi) NNW of Brisbane
- Established: Subdivision started 1972 and completed 1985

Government
  - State electorate: Burdekin
  - Federal divisions: Kennedy; Dawson

Area
  - Total: 49.4 km^{2} (19.1 sq mi)

Population
  - Total: 1,550 (2021 census)
  - Density: 31.38/km^{2} (81.3/sq mi)
- Time zone: UTC+10:00 (AEST)
- Postcode: 4816
Suburbs around Alligator Creek
Julago	Nome	Nome
Brookhill	Alligator Creek	Mount Elliot
Brookhill	Mount Elliot	Mount Elliot

Alligator Creek is a rural locality in the City of Townsville, Queensland, Australia. In the 2021 census, Alligator Creek had a population of 1,550 people.

== Geography ==
Alligator Creek is approximately 30 kilometres (19 mi) south-east of Townsville.

The locality is bounded on the north by the Bruce Highway. The North Coast railway line is aligned with part of the northern boundary, though mostly runs just north of the boundary in Nome.

As the name suggests, the creek Alligator Creek flows through the area from the south-east through to the north. It eventually enters Cleveland Bay within the locality of Cape Cleveland.

Killymoon is a neighbourhood in the north-east of the locality (19.4°S 146.9833°E), with Killymoon Creek running almost parallel to Alligator Creek, though it drains into the adjacent Crocodile Creek system.

The Bowling Green Bay National Park encompasses much of the surrounding mountains, with the most prominent being Mount Elliot, distinguished by the statuesque Cockatoo Rock jutting from the foothills. Mount Elliot's tallest peaks are Mount Elliot proper at 1,221 metres (4,006 ft) and Sharp Elliot at 1,185 metres (3,888 ft). The popular bushwalking track to the Alligator Creek Falls follows the creek upstream and along the north-eastern aspect of the mountain.

Mount Storth (19.412748°S 147.011346°E) and Saddle Mountain (19.445986°S 147.015408°E) border the east, whilst The Sisters Mountains borders the west of the locality. Middle Sister (19.4161°S 146.9058°E) rises to 429 metres (1,407 ft).

== History ==
The region's traditional landowners are the Bindal people, with archaeological sites near Townsville dating back to over 10,000 years ago. The Bindal people call their country Thul Garrie Waja.

Prior to the European settlers, shipwreck survivor James Morrill lived with the Bindal people in the Mount Elliot region from 1846 until 1863, also spending some of that time with the Juru to the south.

The region has been inhabited by European settlers since before the creation of the Kennedy District in 1861, catering to the emerging pastoral industry, and the establishment of Townsville in 1864. Traces of the old coach road still remain, including its crossing of Alligator Creek about 1.7km upstream from the current Bruce Highway bridge. This road remained in regular use until the mid-1970s, although only the western section exists today as Allendale Drive.

The railway stopped at Alligator Creek from 1915 which transported workers and produce from the Alligator Creek meatworks to Townsville. The Alligator Creek meatworks employed 1500 people and was a landmark in the local area until 1966.

Most properties in the area were delivered Townsville town water in 2006.

== Demographics ==
In the 2016 census, Alligator Creek had a population of 1,353 people.

In the 2021 census, Alligator Creek had a population of 1,550 people.

== Education ==
There are no schools in Alligator Creek. The nearest government primary school is Wulguru State School in Wulguru to the north-west. The nearest government secondary school is William Ross State High School in Annandale to the north-west.

== Amenities ==
The Townsville City Council operate a mobile library service which visits Parkland Road at Alligator Creek every second Wednesday morning.

The Gator Girls branch of the Queensland Country Women's Association meets at the Alligator Creek Community & Sports Club at 10 Parklane Road.

The Alligator Creek Pony Club has a long history in the area.

There are some parks in the suburb:

- Mount Panorama Drive Park (19.4252°S 146.9368°E)
- Parkland Road Park (19.3853°S 146.9388°E)
