= RAAF Operations Building Site =

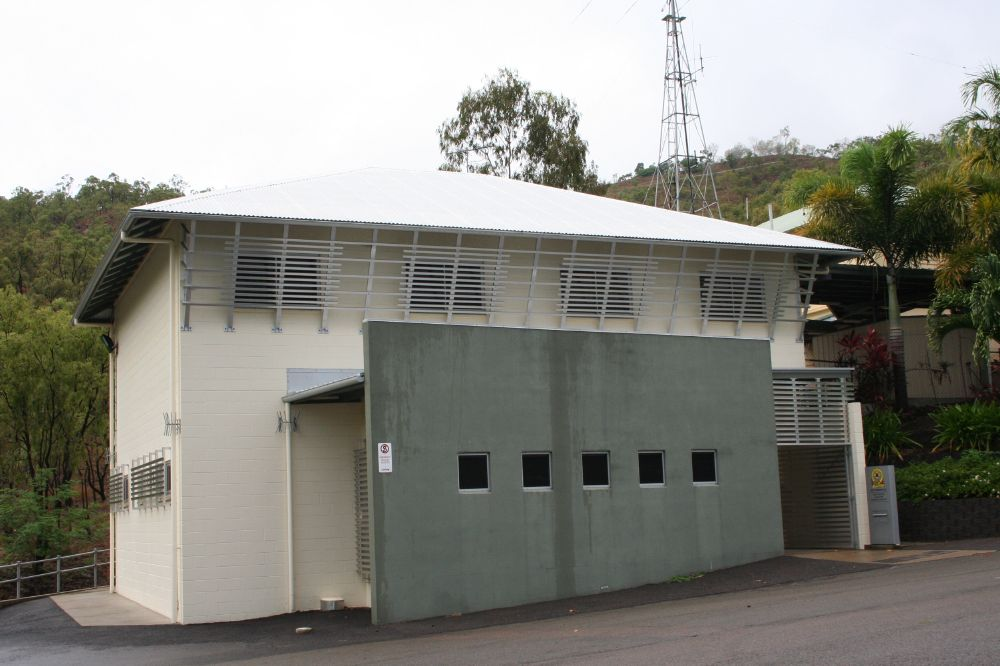
- RAAF Operations Building Site

- Location within Queensland Location within Australia
- 19.2576°S 146.7937°E
- Location: Green Street, West End, City of Townsville, Queensland, Australia

History
- Design period: 1939–1945 (World War II)
- Built: 1942

Queensland Heritage Register
- Official name: RAAF Operations Building Site (former)
- Type: state heritage (built, archaeological)
- Designated: 7 February 2005
- Reference no.: 602260
- Significant period: 1942 (fabric); 1942–1945 (historical)
- Significant components: office/administration building, slab/s – concrete, hut/shack, bunker – concrete, strong room

RAAF Operations Building Site is a heritage-listed command post at Green Street, West End, City of Townsville, Queensland, Australia. It was built in 1942. It was added to the Queensland Heritage Register on 7 February 2005.

== History ==
The former RAAF Operations building was constructed in 1942 as an operation and signals building for the Royal Australian Air Force. The building was operated in association with RAAF Base Townsville established at Garbutt some kilometres to the west, and the United States Army Air Forces (USAAF) Base. The lower section was constructed of reinforced concrete with a flat concrete roof, while a timber "residence" was built on top of the operations building to conceal it from the air.

Townsville was established as a port in 1864, in association with pastoral expansion of the time. Pastoralists had pushed the frontier of non-Indigenous settlement north as far as Rockhampton by the late 1850s. In search of additional productive runs, pastoralists continued moving north along the Queensland coast and inland. The Townsville site was recommended to the Queensland Government as a suitable port by two pastoralists, Robert Towns and John Melton Black, being part of Black's pastoral holdings. Land was sold from 1865 when the town was proclaimed a port of entry and a small settlement developed. By 1866, Townsville supported banks and hotels, wharves and stores and a local newspaper.

By the late nineteenth century, Townsville had established the necessary infrastructure to be the dominant city of the north. Apart from the port, the railway head and the location of the Supreme Court in the north, there were other things in its favour, and the town was proclaimed a city in 1902. In the early 1920s, the North Coast rail line from Brisbane to Townsville was completed, prompting further development within the town fuelled by these transport links. By 1940, when the Second World War was being fought predominantly in Europe and North Africa, Townsville had a population of about 30,000. With the entry of the Japanese and Americans into the war in late 1941, the population of Townsville swelled with a huge influx of both Australian and American troops. Military personnel outnumbered civilians by more than three to one as the population headed towards 100,000.

The Australian Air Force (AAF) was established on 31 March 1921, becoming the Royal Australian Air Force (RAAF) on 31 August of the same year. Prior to that, the Australian Flying Corps (AFC) had begun in 1914 and was based at Point Cook in Victoria, where aviation training was carried out. Administratively, however, the AFC was part of the existing armed forces, and it was not until the formation of the RAAF that an independent air force was established as part of the Australian armed services.

An airfield for civil aviation was established at Townsville by the city council in the late 1920s. The site of this field was quite poor, however, and an alternative site at Garbutt, west of the city centre, was chosen for a new airfield. This site was part of the large reserve of low-lying land known as the Town Common, used primarily for grazing. Land was cleared and the airfield prepared, opening in January 1939 and operated by the Townsville City Council. Facilities were almost non-existent, with a single runway consisting of a gravelled path.

The increase in Japanese military activity in the Pacific in the late 1930s led the Australian Government to establish air bases in the north of Australia. The Department of Defence began negotiations with the Townsville City Council to transfer the Garbutt aerodrome to the Commonwealth in early 1939. The acquisition was completed on 12 December 1940 and construction of a series of buildings began for the RAAF on site, including hangars, workshops, accommodation buildings and mess rooms. The existing lightly gravelled runway, originally 100 feet (30 m) wide, was upgraded to RAAF status to 150 feet (46 m) and lengthened. By mid-1941, 24 Squadron of the RAAF were based at Garbutt. Civil aviation also continued at the site during this period.

The base was further developed by the Americans in late 1941. War was looming in the Pacific in the early 1940s, as it had in Europe in the late 1930s. The Americans required bases in the region to maintain supplies to their forces in the Philippines, and by late 1941 the USAAF was in Townsville to develop its own facilities at the RAAF base. The American base, United States of America 4th Air Depot, Garbutt, was planned for aircraft repair and assembly. A large camp was constructed with 35 "igloo" type buildings used as repair shops, stores and office accommodation.

With the bombing of Pearl Harbor on 7 December 1941 the Americans had been brought into the war. The Japanese advance south was swift and successful, taking the Philippines, Hong Kong, Malaya and Rabaul in January and Singapore in February 1942. In the same month Darwin was bombed. Faced with the threat of invasion, (Townsville was put on invasion alert on 1 May 1942), the Australian and American Governments began to develop a major military base in the Townsville region. As a result, the air base at Townsville was further expanded as thousands of troops descended upon the city. Further air fields were developed west of Garbutt, and further west again at Charters Towers and Macrossan. The sphere of influence of the Townsville base was much wider than before. Townsville became the base for North East Area Command, with its major responsibility the protecting of sea lanes to the north to Port Moresby.

During the war, particularly in the early part of the Pacific campaign, the Townsville air base was crucial to fighting. Along with Darwin, the base was one of the principal air transport centres in Australia, an important air base of strategic value. It was also one of the few air bases in Australia from which fighter aircraft engaged enemy aircraft.

The operations building at Green Street was constructed in 1942 as part of the rapid development of the Garbutt air base, after the commencement of the war in the Pacific. The site chosen for the building was some kilometres from the air force base, in an undeveloped portion of land that contained one or two sheds and fowl houses. This area may have been part of the Town Common, providing a common area for grazing and tending to animals. The operations building did not need to be located on the air base, and in some respects, it was more appropriately sited off base. The activities carried out within the building were not strictly related to the daily operations at the air base, but were however, quite sensitive and extremely important to the Allied war effort.

Drawings for the building were prepared in April 1942 by engineers in the Department of the Interior. The drawings indicate the sensitive nature of the building. The building's function was not referred to in any construction drawings. It was usually referred to as "RAAF Project No 81" or "Reinforced concrete building No 81", and the drawings for the preparation of the site were stamped "SECRET".

It is likely that the building was constructed by the Allied Works Council (AWC), the organisation established to coordinate the construction of wartime buildings in Australia. The AWC was established in February 1942, and undertook most of the construction of the necessary wartime infrastructure such as buildings like the one at Green Street. AWC records indicate that a reinforced concrete operational control building in Townsville had been completed by June 1942. Its construction had been designated an "A1" priority, and its total cost was £30,000. The building described is quite probably the one in Green Street. Designed as a rectangular building of reinforced concrete construction, a "traverse" or protective wall, three metres high, was shown on drawings, constructed around the perimeter of the building to protect it from attack. The external walls and all the internal walls of the operations building were constructed of reinforced concrete. To disguise the building from the air, a separate building was constructed at one end of the flat roof of the building. Of timber construction with a corrugated iron dwelling, this additional dwelling was designed to resemble a typical domestic dwelling, so that when viewed from the air, the complex would be inconspicuous.

Internally, the reinforced concrete building contained a crew room, operations room, a signals office, receiving room, rooms for intelligence, navigations, signals and meteorological offices, an emergency power plant and a telephone exchange. A cypher room and strong room were also provided. The building had its own air conditioning system; a small fan room separate from the main part of the building was constructed to the west of the main building and provided air conditioning plant and servicing to the operations room. Air conditioning ducts were run through the main corridor of the building.

A separate orderly hut, lavatory block and miscellaneous hut were also constructed. The two hut buildings had "dummy" stove recesses to further disguise the nature of the site. The construction drawings indicate that the iron to be used on the roofs of the buildings was to be painted to look older than it actually was. The drawings of these buildings were prepared in August 1942 by ET Doig, the Superintending Engineer of the Department of the Interior.

The building functioned as an overall communications centre for the base of the North East Area command, an area on the north-eastern coast of Australia to the Gulf of Carpentaria and up to Port Moresby. The movements of Australian aircraft within this strategic area were controlled from this building. Flight operations were planned and monitored from here, briefing and debriefing sessions with pilots were carried out. In May 1942 the Battle of the Coral Sea was fought, a naval and aerial assault against the Japanese off the north-east coast of Australia. A significant Allied victory, the Battle of the Coral Sea was the first major repulse of the Japanese in the Pacific after their series of successful conquests south since December 1941.

While designed to resemble a residence, the timber building constructed on top of the operations building was a major part of the facility as well. An L-shaped structure, it contained rooms for an adjutant, an orderly's room, and warrant officer and an engineer officer, as well as another strong room. There were no internal links between the buildings, the timber building being accessed by timber staircases to the ground. A flower box, shrubs and an artificial tree were placed around the building to emphasise its domestic appearance. The drawings prepared for the building indicate that "timber" battening and supporting posts were to be painted on the traverse, again, to hide the presence of the operations building. Further camouflage work was undertaken on the remaining section of the concrete roof in the form of garnished netting. Camouflage is an important component of the art of warfare. The term came into use during the First World War and was derived from the French term "camoufler", meaning to "make up for the stage". A general definition of camouflage is the "art of concealing that you are concealing". All manner of war material and personnel can and have been camouflaged.

The manner of camouflage employed at the Green Street site, with the construction of a house on top of the concrete ground floor was that of concealment. From the air, the operations building would have looked like a typical Queensland house. Further, the other buildings on site, with their dummy stove recesses, skillion roofs and other disguising elements, would not have been conspicuous. Techniques like this were popular ways to disguise structures from the air. In many instances large factories were disguised by draping equally large camouflage nets across them that were painted in such a way that from the air the scene resembled a typical residence or rural landscape. In America during the Second World War, aircraft factories in California were concealed in this way.

The Green Street site was not the only intelligence unit in the area, nor was it the only camouflaged building. The Royal Australian Air Force operated the No 1 Wireless Unit at Stuart. This was a highly secret post intercepting aircraft transmission signals. A RAAF officer, serving in Townsville described a visit to a telegraphists' bunker at Stuart:

"My first impression was that it was an old farm house. It had been camouflaged with verandah rails and doors etc. and it wasn't until you got right up to it that you realized that you were looking at a solid concrete building. Inside there were about thirty operators sitting in front of receivers and a real live Japanese who was an interpreter and ...was not allowed to leave the station. The only external evidence that there was something unusual going on was the aerial array... "

The use of camouflage in Australia was not uncommon. The East Sale RAAF base in Victoria was constructed in such a way that from the air it looked like a country town. Other examples include the roofs of buildings being painted to make them appear like tennis courts.

The form of the former RAAF Operations building, a reinforced concrete bunker below, and a timber residential building above, to disguise the lower building, is a now rare example of a camouflaged building from the Second World War surviving in its partially camouflaged form. Other elements of camouflage indicated on drawings at the time, such as the artificial tree and the painting of stumps and balustrading on the traverse no longer survive. The traverse is also no longer extant, demolished at an unknown date. The major aspect of the camouflage however, the timber "residential" upper floor still survives and allows the building to be understood.

Other examples of a camouflage site in the Townsville area include the No 1 Wireless Unit which still exists, located a few hundred metres from the main highway, however, it is not in as good condition as the Green Street site. Also the Operations and Signals Bunker at Stuart has remnants of its external camouflage colour scheme, chosen to blend with the pink granite of Mt Stuart, still evident.

Thousands of Allied forces were concentrated in Queensland and a vast expanse of military infrastructure was constructed to accommodate this influx of personnel and equipment. Much of the work was of a temporary nature and relatively little evidence remains to demonstrate the extent and nature of military activity. Most buildings and infrastructure were dismantled and removed soon after the cessation of hostilities in August 1945.

Until 1943, the air base in Townsville was a joint operation between the Australians and the Americans. In June of that year, control was handed over to the Americans alone, and remained that way until early 1945. The threat of Japanese invasion, however, had receded by late 1942, after the Battles of the Coral Sea and Midway. The air force base at Townsville, and the operations building at Green Street, lessened in importance as wartime operations moved north and Townsville's air bases became large workshop areas in the later years of the war. There are few records regarding the Green Street site and the operations building at the time of the war's end. A request however, was made to the Department of the Interior in June 1947 to officially acquire the Green Street site. The Commonwealth acquired title to the site in 1951. The RAAF base in Townsville was always considered a permanent base, and after the war the base was reduced in size to that originally planned before the war.

The RAAF was located at the Green Street site until the late 1960s, when with the changes in the organisation of the air force, the building was no longer required. While the site has remained in the ownership of the Department of Defence, the State Emergency Service (SES) in Townsville has been based at Green Street since the late 1960s when RAAF operations were relocated to another site. Some buildings on the site from the wartime period have been removed with the SES occupancy of the site, while others have been added. While no technical equipment remains inside the building, or on the rest of the site, the building is still available as a "remote operations headquarters" for the nearby RAAF base if required in times of war or national emergency.

A review was undertaken by the Department of Defence in 1996, identifying properties that could be rationalised. The Green Street site was earmarked for disposal as part of that review. The building is no longer owned by the Department of Defence.

== Description ==
The former operations building is the major building on the site. It comprises two sections. The lower section is constructed of reinforced concrete with a flat concrete roof, floor and walls and the second story, a building resembling a house constructed on top of the concrete building. Internally, the lower section of the main building has a central corridor running roughly east–west lengthways, with rooms opening off the corridor. These rooms housed the former receiving room and signals office. At the eastern end of the building some walls have been removed to create a larger space now used as a lecture room. The room has a tiered floor and rendered walls. The section remains largely in its original form with only minor alterations, including the removal of the original mechanical ventilation system.

The upper section is a typical tropical building with a pitched roof, larger overhangs, louvred and casement fenestrations and exposed stud timber wall framing. The interior of the building is lined with plywood. Internally, the upper section has a number of room opening from two corridors. A strong room is located in the north-east section of the house. The upper section has had the verandah enclosed and bathroom and kitchen facilities modified. The roof sheeting has been replaced with colorbond. Some of the louvred panels have been removed or sheeted over. The area beside the house, covering the lower section, has been sheeted with bitumen. This area was formerly camouflaged with garnished netting.

The former Orderly Room, later used as a recreation room by the SES, is a low set single building with a rectangular plan form with a combination of a gabled roof and skillion roof disguising externally the size of the single internal space. The building has been extended with two small lean-tos. The main building has a corrugated fibro roof with weatherboard cladding. The additions are clad in fibro sheeting with a corrugated iron roof. A kitchen and bar have been added to the building by the SES. A suspended grid ceiling has been installed throughout the building.

A number of ancillary structures are also located on the site. The rappel tower (post 1969) is a timber pole structure with elevated platforms on two levels. It was constructed for SES training.

== Heritage listing ==
The former RAAF Operations Building Site was listed on the Queensland Heritage Register on 7 February 2005 having satisfied the following criteria.

The place is important in demonstrating the evolution or pattern of Queensland's history.

The former RAAF Operations Building site is significant as part of the infrastructure developed in Townsville during the Second World War, a time when the population of the town trebled with the influx of Australian and American troops. Functioning as an overall communications centre for the base of the North East Area command, an area on the north-eastern coast of Australia to the Gulf of Carpentaria and up to Port Moresby, the former RAAF Operations building site is significant as one of a number of Second World War structures and complexes which survive in the Townsville area, demonstrating the substantial role the region, and particularly Townsville, played in the war in the Pacific.

The place demonstrates rare, uncommon or endangered aspects of Queensland's cultural heritage.

The former RAAF Operations Building is significant as a rare and substantially intact example providing evidence of the use of sophisticated camouflage techniques developed during the Second World War. While there are similar buildings of this type and of the same period that survive, the former RAAF Operations Building is particularly significant as it has been only slightly modified since 1942.

The place is important in demonstrating the principal characteristics of a particular class of cultural places.

With its reinforced concrete construction and timber "residence" placed over for camouflage purposes, the building is a good, intact example of this type of wartime construction with the evidence of concealment still in place. Other examples of a camouflage site in the Townsville area include the No 1 Wireless Unit which still exists, located a few hundred metres from the main highway, however, it is not in as good condition as the Green Street site. Also the Operations and Signals Bunker at Stuart has remnants of its external camouflage colour scheme, chosen to blend with the pink granite of Mt Stuart, still evident.

The place has a special association with the life or work of a particular person, group or organisation of importance in Queensland's history.

The former RAAF Operations Building site has a special association with the Australian and American military personnel in north Queensland during the Second World War, and with the work of the Allied Works Council in coordinating wartime construction activity at a national level.
