= Murray, Queensland =

Murray
- Suburb
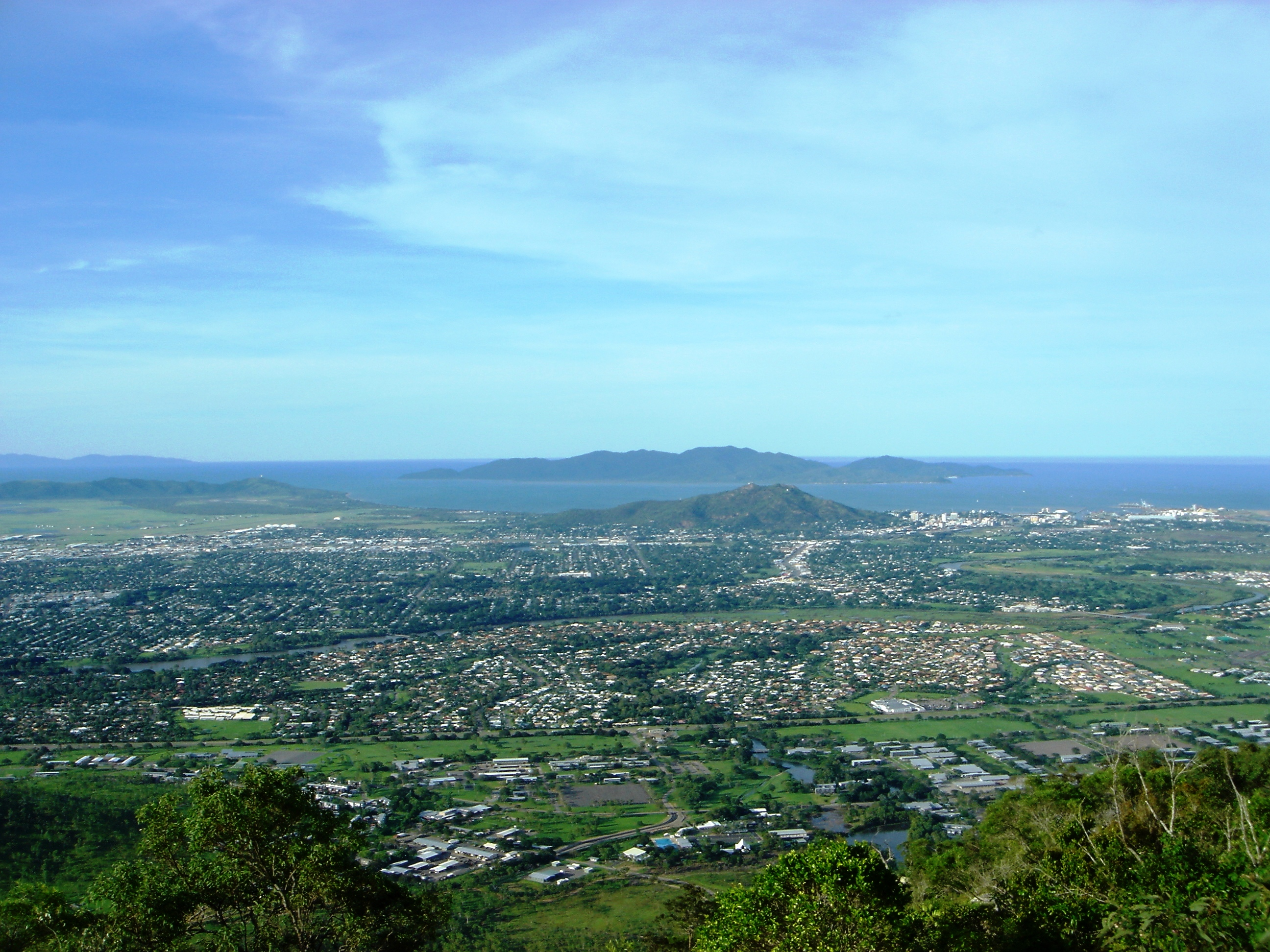
- View from Mount Stuart with Lavarack Barracks in the foreground, 2008

- Interactive map of Murray
- Coordinates: 19.3352°S 146.7908°E
- Country: Australia
- State: Queensland
- City: Townsville
- LGA: City of Townsville
- Location: 10.1 km (6.3 mi) SSW of Townsville CBD; 1,353 km (841 mi) NNW of Brisbane

Government
  - State electorate: Mundingburra
  - Federal divisions: Herbert; Dawson; Kennedy

Area
  - Total: 12.1 km^{2} (4.7 sq mi)

Population
  - Total: 1,739 (2021 census)
  - Density: 143.7/km^{2} (372.2/sq mi)
- Time zone: UTC+10:00 (AEST)
- Postcode: 4814
Suburbs around Murray
| Annandale | Annandale | Wulguru |
| Douglas | Murray | Roseneath |
| Mount Stuart | Mount Stuart | Roseneath |

Murray is a suburb of Townsville in the City of Townsville, Queensland, Australia. It is not a conventional suburb, with the developed land in the suburb being within the Australian Army's Lavarack Barracks. In the 2021 census, Murray had a population of 1,739 people.

== Geography ==
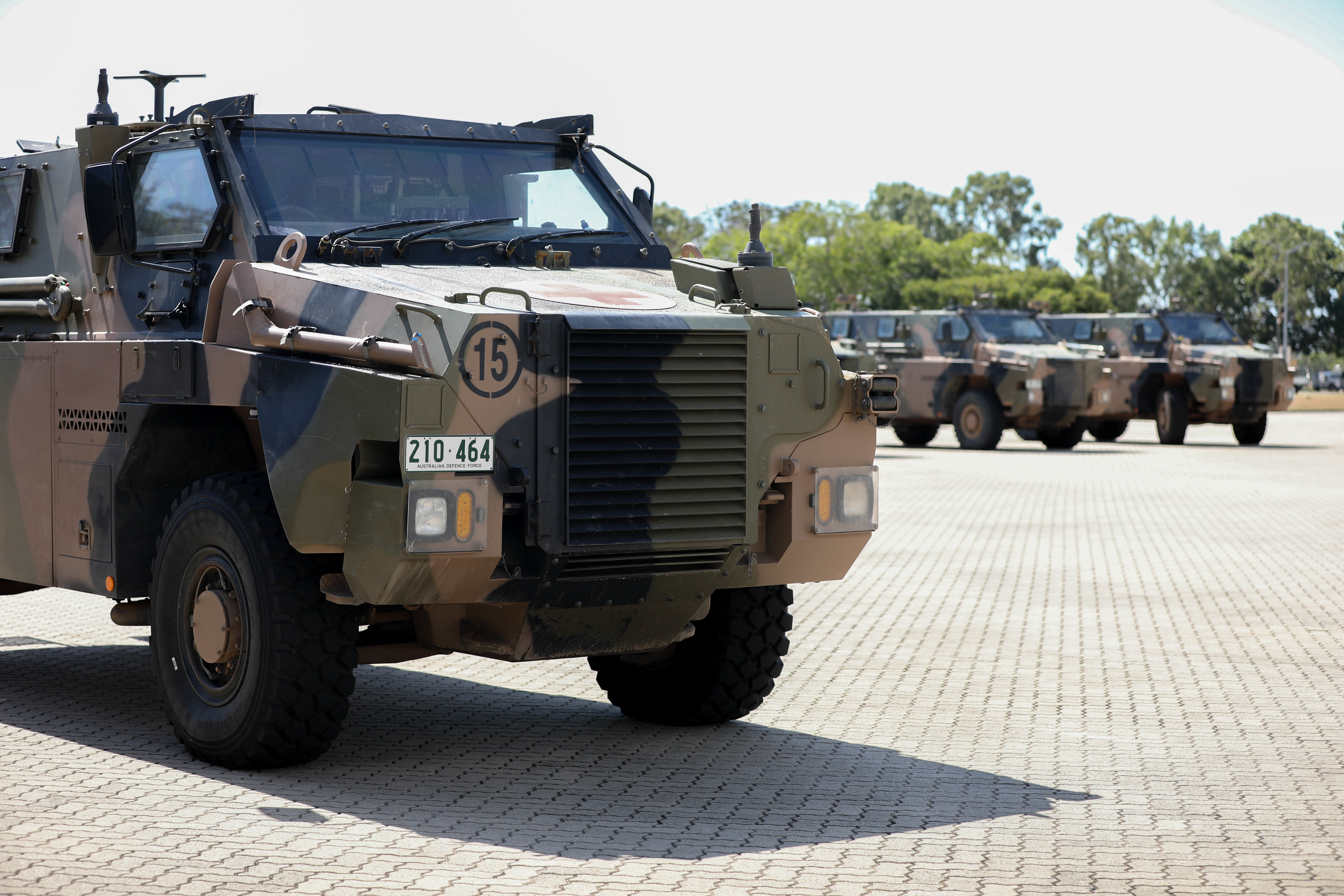
Bushmasters at Lavarack Barracks during Talisman Sabre military exercises, 2021

The suburb is bounded by University Road to the north.

The southern parts of the suburb are on the slopes of Mount Stuart and are undeveloped. The northern part of the suburb is occupied by the Lavarack Barracks.

== History ==
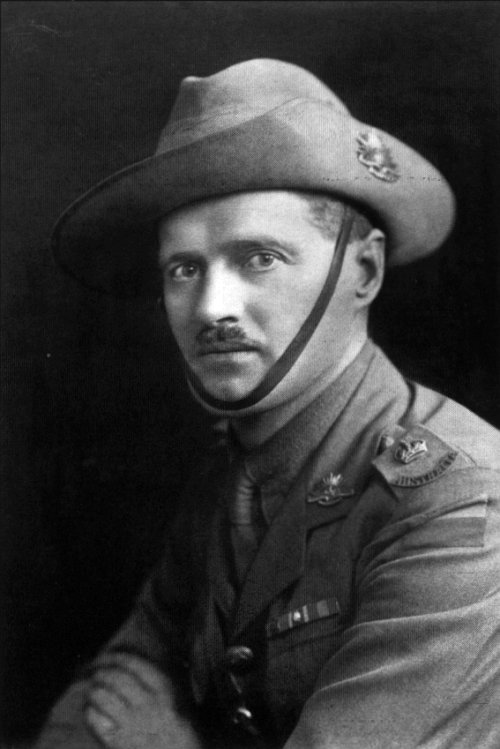
Major Harry Murray VC, 1917

Murray is situated in the traditional Bindal and Wulgurukaba Aboriginal country.

The origin of the suburb name is from Lieutenant Colonel Henry William Murray who was awarded the Victoria Cross in 1917 for his actions during the Battle of the Somme.

On 21 July 1939, with the Second World War looming, Murray volunteered for military service and was appointed as commanding officer of the 26th (Militia) Battalion, 11th Brigade, based in Townsville; he was mobilised for full-time service on 21 October 1941. The 26th became an Australian Imperial Force unit in 1942, and in August Murray was removed from his post by General Sir Thomas Blamey, Commander in Chief Australian Military Forces, on the grounds of his advancing age. He was instead appointed to command the 23rd Queensland Regiment, Volunteer Defence Corps, which he led until his retirement from active duty on 8 February 1944.

The suburb was named after Murray on 1 April 1969.

In 1972, the Lavarack Golf Club opened at the barracks on land leased from Australian Department of Defence (19.3199°S 146.7813°E). It was an 18-hole course and open to membership by the wider community. In December 2021, the golf club closed as the Department of Defence did not wish to renew the lease as it intended to redevelop the land as sporting and training facilities for defence force use.

== Demographics ==
In the 2016 census, Murray had a population of 1,491 people.

In the 2021 census, Murray had a population of 1,739 people.

== Education ==
There are no schools in Murray. The nearest government primary schools are Annandale State School in neighbouring Annandale to the north and Wulguru State School in neighbouring Wulguru to the north-east. The nearest government secondary school is William Ross State High School in neighbouring Annandale to the north.
