= Nome, Queensland =

Nome
- Suburb
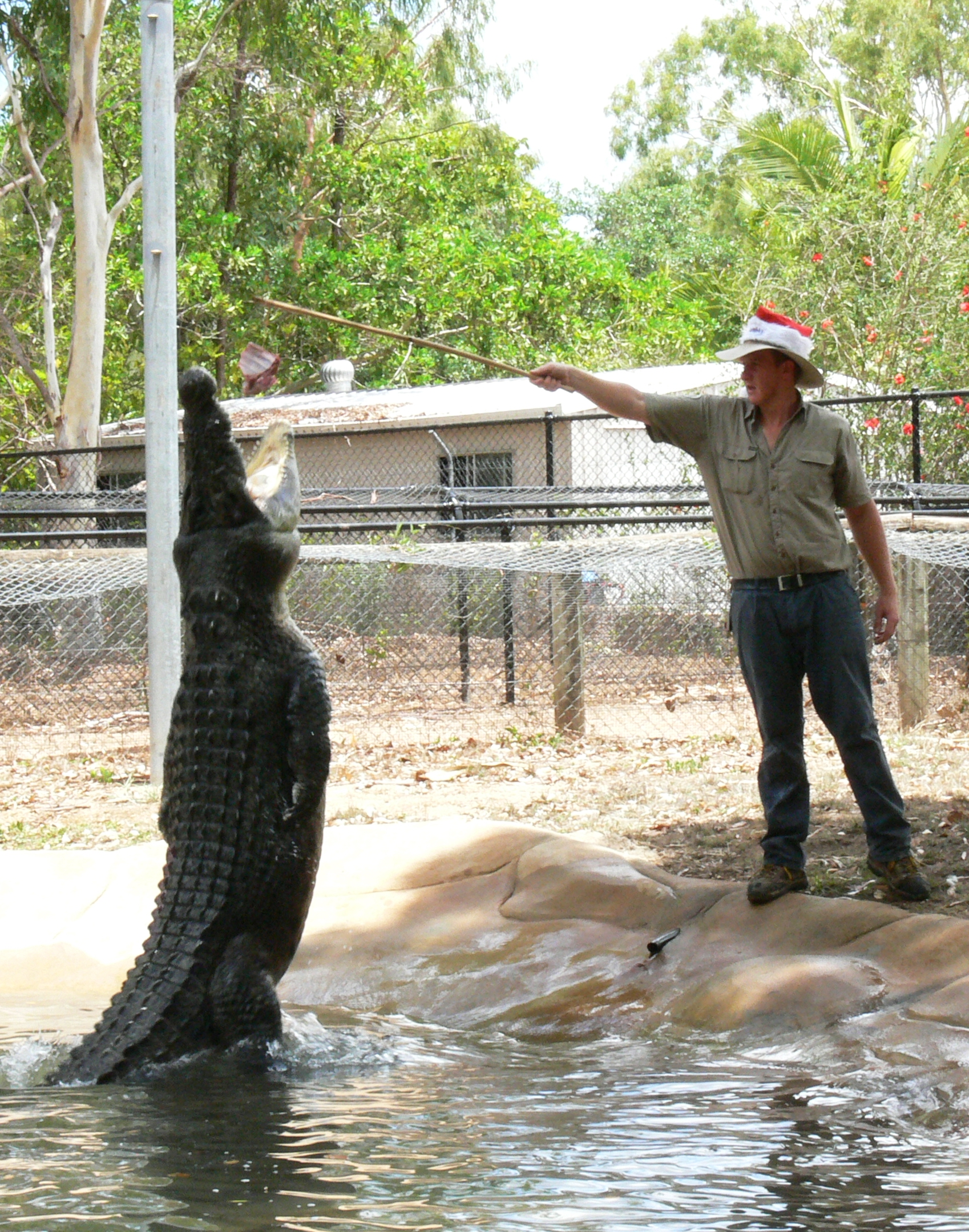
- Crocodile Feeding at the Billabong Sanctuary, 2009

- Interactive map of Nome
- Coordinates: 19.3594°S 146.9508°E
- Country: Australia
- State: Queensland
- LGA: City of Townsville
- Location: 19.1 km (11.9 mi) SE of Townsville CBD; 1,314 km (816 mi) NNW of Brisbane

Government
  - State electorate: Burdekin
  - Federal divisions: Dawson; Kennedy

Area
  - Total: 53.1 km^{2} (20.5 sq mi)

Population
  - Total: 990 (2021 census)
  - Density: 18.64/km^{2} (48.29/sq mi)
- Time zone: UTC+10:00 (AEST)
- Postcode: 4816
Suburbs around Nome
Stuart	Cape Cleveland	Cape Cleveland
Julago	Nome	Cape Cleveland
Alligator Creek	Alligator Creek	Mount Elliot

Nome is a rural locality in the City of Townsville, Queensland, Australia. In the 2021 census, Nome had a population of 990 people.

== Geography ==
The Bruce Highway forms the southern boundary of the locality. The North Coast railway line enters the locality from the east (Cape Cleveland) and roughly follows Nome's southern boundary before exiting to the west (Julago).

There were a number of railway stations in the locality, all now abandoned (from north to south):

- Nome railway station (19.3747°S 146.9200°E)
- Alligator Creek railway station (19.3877°S 146.9554°E)
- Killymoon railway station (19.3908°S 146.9892°E)

Oolbun is a neighbourhood on the northern boundary in the locality (19.3251°S 146.9281°E).

The locality has the following mountains:

- Mount Matthew (19.3433°S 146.9082°E) 305 metres (1,001 ft)
- Woodstock Hill (19.3602°S 146.9853°E) 234 metres (768 ft)

Nome has an area of 53.1 square kilometers and an average elevation of 39 meters above sea level.

The land use is predominantly grazing on native vegetation with a number of areas of rural residential housing. There is also a small amount of crop growing in the south-east of the locality.

== History ==
The locality's name is derived the from railway station name, which in turn is believed to be a corruption of NQME (North Queensland Meat Export) Siding.

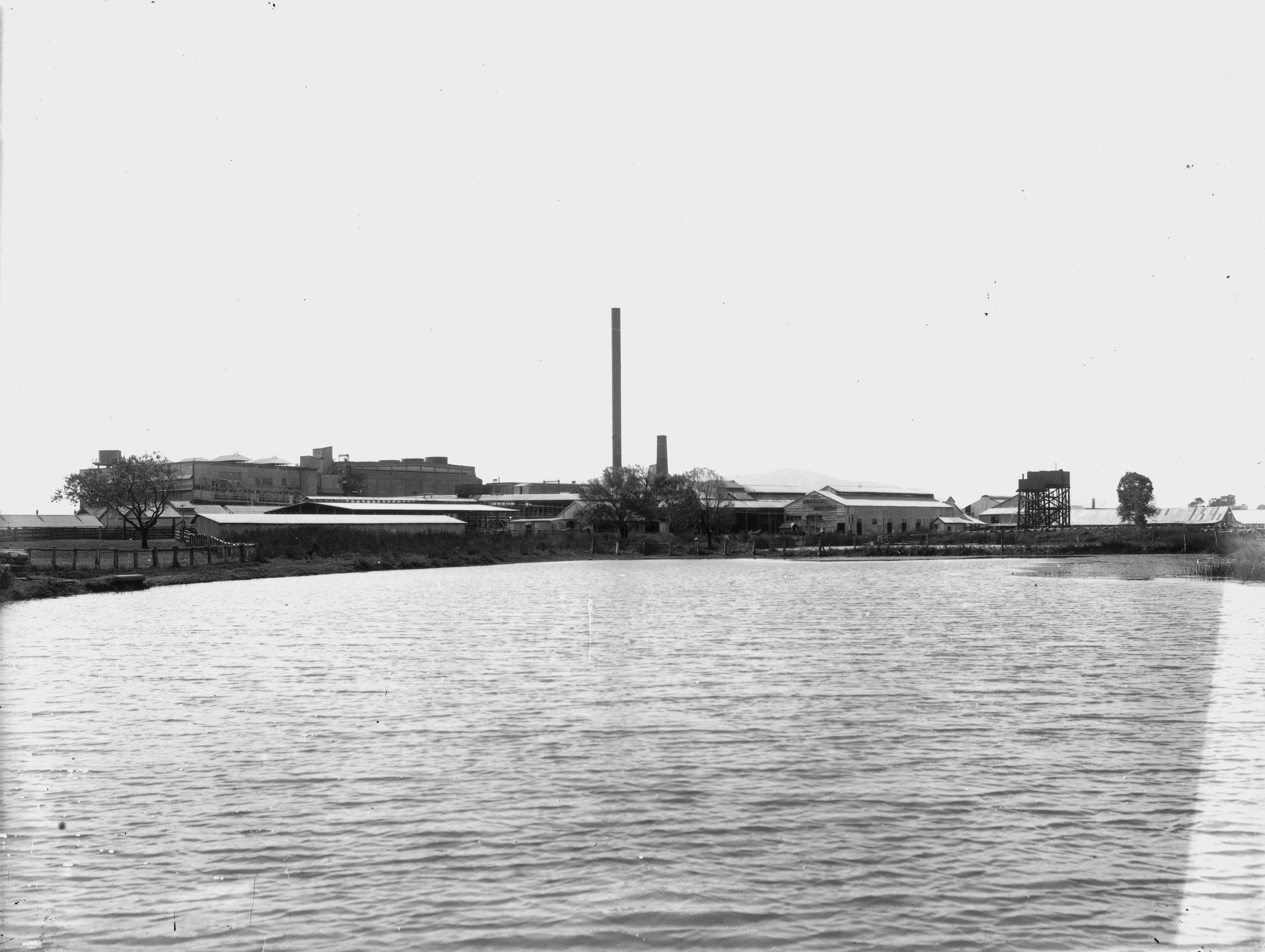
Alligator Creek Meatworks, 1917

Oolbun was the neighbourhood where the Alligator Creek meatworks (approx 19.3249°S 146.9397°E) and the housing for many of its employees was located. North Queensland Boiling Down and Meat Processing Company established the meatworks in 1879, but the 1884 drought resulted in its closure. In 1890, the meatworks reopened as a meat extract businesses, later becoming a freezing plant in 1914 supplying frozen meat during World War I. In 1914, a railway line was built connecting the meatworks which was serviced by the Oolbun railway station to the Nome railway station on the North Coast railway line. The meatworks closed in 1966. The railway line and Oolbun railway station are no longer extant.

Oolbun Provisional School opened in 1917. It closed circa 1932. It was part of the complex of buildings at the meatworks.

== Demographics ==
In the 2011 census, Nome had a population of 992 people. Of these, 525 were male, and 467 were female. The median age was 47, the median personal income was A$635/week, and the median household income was A$1356/week. Most residents were Australian by birth, but Nome also has significant communities from the United Kingdom and New Zealand.

In the 2016 census, Nome had a population of 1,016 people.

In the 2021 census, Nome had a population of 990 people.

== Education ==
There are no schools in Nome. The nearest government primary schools are Wulguru State School in Wulguru to the west and Giru State School in Giru to the south-east. The nearest government secondary school is William Ross State High School in Annandale, Townsville.

== Amenities ==
There is a park at the end of Bloodwood Drive (19.3754°S 146.9162°E).

== Attractions ==
The Billabong Sanctuary is an interactive wildlife sanctuary at 2 Muntalunga Drive (19.3747°S 146.9058°E).
