= Tobacco Kiln, Oak Valley =

Tobacco Kiln
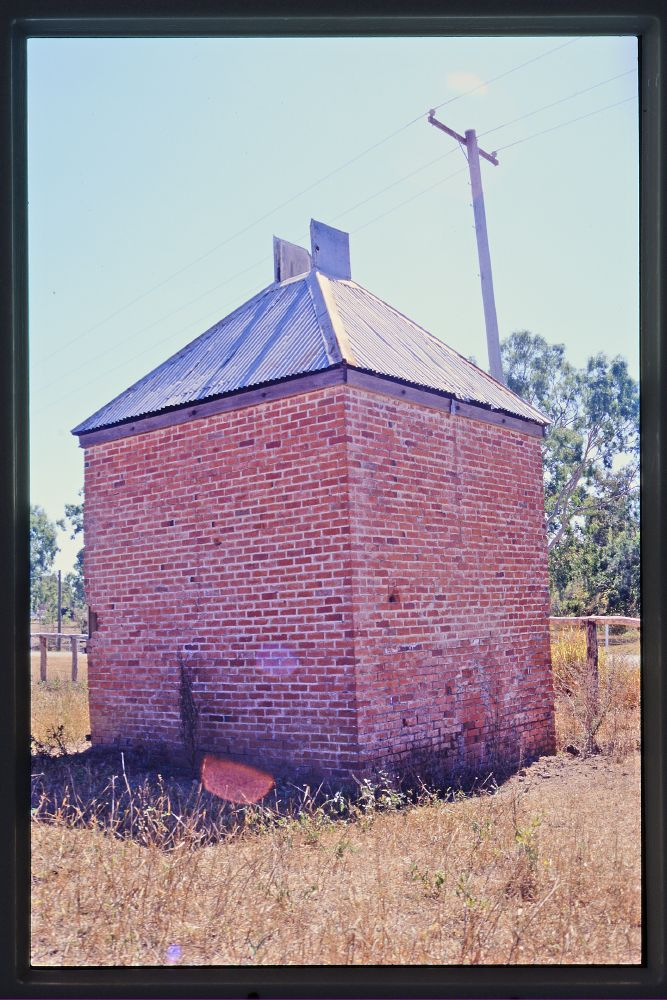
- Tobacco Kiln, Oak Valley, July 2002

- Location within Queensland
- 19.4162°S 146.8234°E
- Location: 12 Chisholm Trail, Oak Valley, City of Townsville, Queensland, Australia

History
- Design period: 1919 - 1930s (interwar period)
- Built: c. 1933

Queensland Heritage Register
- Official name: Tobacco Kiln, Flue Curing Barn
- Type: state heritage (built)
- Designated: 27 September 2002
- Reference no.: 602343
- Significant period: 1933 (fabric); 1930s (historical)
- Significant components: kiln - tobacco drying, flue
- Builders: Dick Moyes

Tobacco Kiln is a heritage-listed kiln at 12 Chisholm Trail, Oak Valley, City of Townsville, Queensland, Australia. It was built c. 1933 by Dick Moyes. It is also known as Flue Curing Barn. It was added to the Queensland Heritage Register on 27 September 2002.

== History ==
The four metre square brick tobacco kiln or flue curing barn at 12 Chisholm Trail, Oak Valley stands on a small 150-square-metre (1,600 sq ft) block currently owned by the Townsville City Council. When constructed c. 1933, the block on which the tobacco kiln is situated comprised 157 acres of farming land owned by Greek immigrant, Elias Emmanuel. There is some indication that Dick Moyes may have built the kiln.

In the early 1930s the tobacco industry expanded in North Queensland following government initiatives to combat growing unemployment created by worldwide economic depression, and thereby boosting local economies.

The Australian and Queensland governments, together with the British-Australian Tobacco Company, jointly funded the Australian Tobacco Investigation Committee to find areas suitable for good quality tobacco growth. As a result, the Queensland Department of Agriculture and Stock tested twenty-five experimental tobacco plots during the 1927–28 season. This occurred in an area from Bowen to Mareeba and west to Pentland and Chillagoe, with one plot tried at Hervey's Range, about 25 miles (40 km) west of Townsville. All of these areas proved successful, producing a bright tobacco with good colour, aroma, texture and aging qualities. Mareeba became the site for a government experimental farm, since its surrounding district contained large areas with the most suitable sandy soils and climatic conditions. During the following two seasons, the department conducted further trials at this farm, while several areas including Pentland, Charters Towers, Hervey's Range and Chillagoe tried crops on a commercial scale. Despite adverse weather conditions that affected the yield per acre, the leaf obtained good prices, and many people hailed North Queensland as the premier tobacco growing area of Australia.

The demand for tobacco land spread suddenly. In mid-1930 the government released at least 25 portions of land as agricultural homesteads in the Mareeba district. These attracted special purchase conditions. A local unemployment relief scheme to clear the land, and the availability of trained instructors from the department also initially assisted Mareeba farmers. This enabled them to meet the 1930–31 season. Some crown land and some private subdivisions appeared at Hervey's Range in 1931, and tobacco fever also spread to the Major's Creek-Woodstock area south of Townsville, which then included Oak Valley. Tobacco growing in this area peaked with 31 farms in 1932 and had disappeared by 1940.

Several factors contributed to the failure of the Townsville tobacco industry. It was generally considered that the Experimental Farm at Mareeba contributed greatly to the success of the industry in that area. Although the Townsville and District Development Association agitated for a government Experimental Farm in this area to provide support for local inexperienced growers, this never eventuated. Water was always a problem as tobacco growers relied on the northern wet season. Failure of the season had drastic consequences, as did a heavy season. The tobacco plant was particularly prone to diseases and pests. Inexperienced farmers lacked the expertise to deal with these diseases, as well as cope with the complicated curing process. Government fiscal policy did not always favour the local grower: increased excise on home-grown tobacco and reduced duties on imports were blamed for the unsatisfactory position of the industry in 1934. This variety of causes often meant farmers could not sell a large enough portion of their crop at prices high enough to cover their capital outlay. Capital required to establish a tobacco farm was estimated at £950, a considerable sum in the 1930s. This included the cultivation of 15 acres, deposit on land, a small hut, clearing, curing barns, bulk shed, horses, farm equipment and some labour costs.

One of the major costs was the construction of a curing barn, or barns, depending on the size of the farm. Local tobacco kilns were essential as it was imperative that tobacco leaf be cured immediately after harvesting, and a number of kilns appeared in the Hervey's Range and Woodstock areas. Kiln walls had to be insulated and farmers used different materials, according to their means and the availability of local resources. Different constructions in the Townsville area included brick, two layers of corrugated iron filled with sand, bush timber coated with cement plaster, home-made concrete brick, reinforced concrete, and sun-dried bricks of clay and chopped grass.

The curing process was crucial, and flue curing was the most modern, scientific method available in the 1930s. The kiln at 12 Chisholm Trail used this new technology, closely resembling drawings of a model flue curing barn in the Queensland Agricultural Journal of August 1931. The flues carried heat at ground level from the outside furnace, across the barn and back to the chimney outlets, raising the temperature inside the kiln and thereby curing the tobacco. This process overcame earlier curing problems such as leaf contamination by smoke from open fires, and also allowed greater control over heat and humidity in the curing barn.

The object of curing was to obtain leaf with a bright yellow colour similar to that of a fresh ripe lemon. After cutting, several tobacco leaves were strung together, tied to a stick at regular spaces, and then hung on tier poles in the curing barn. The leaf was then cured in an extremely complicated process involving three distinct stages: yellowing the leaf, fixing the colour and killing the leaf, and completely drying the leaf. The first stage needed a warm humid atmosphere to complete the ripening process; the second increased the heat and lowered the humidity through controlled ventilation until leaf veins were substantially dry; and the third further increased heat and decreased ventilation until the entire leaf and stem was completely dried. This process necessitated specialized knowledge to control heat, humidity and ventilation, and could differ slightly depending on the type and condition of the crop. This challenged inexperienced farmers entering the tobacco industry.

A report in 1984 stated that some old kilns in the Majors Creek area were then being used as storage sheds on farms. However, it is probable that the brick tobacco kiln at 12 Chisholm Trail is the only kiln in the area still containing remnants of flues and some tier poles, which indicates that it was never reused for other purposes. It was probably built sometime in 1933. A piece of iron visible in the top vent clearly shows an imprint of the queen's head with the number 33 underneath. This is a well known Lysaght insignia for its flat sheeting, and the number indicates that it was produced in 1933. With the tobacco industry in decline after 1932, it is unlikely that the kiln was built much later than this.

The bricks used in the construction appear to be commercially made, however there is some variation in the stretcher length between 220 and 225 millimetres (8.7 and 8.9 in) which could contradict this. There was a local brickworks located nearby at Stuart, but there was also a contemporary report about some farmers with brick-working skills and ample supplies of local clay. Investigation into this is continuing. The brick and iron construction would have involved considerable expense. A similar brick construction in the same area was quoted as costing £65. The willingness to invest considerable capital in the industry shows either a solid faith in its potential or a desperation to survive in harsh economic times.

The Townsville tobacco industry did have some positive impact on the district. It was one of the major reasons for the formation of the Townsville and District Development Association. Lobbying by the growers on Hervey's Range prompted the construction of a new access road and this provided employment to a large number of men through an Unemployment Relief Scheme. The establishment of a local tobacco grading company also provided some employment during the worst years of the Great Depression. The kiln at 12 Chisholm Trail stands as a reminder of the tobacco industry of the 1930s. Though short-lived, it was an important phase in the evolution of the Townsville district.

== Description ==
The tobacco kiln or flue curing barn is an almost-square building of brick construction now situated on a small 10-by-15-metre (33 ft × 49 ft) block of land at 12 Chisholm Trail, Oak Valley, via Townsville. This block is not fenced, but has been enclosed within the fence line of the adjoining property on the corner of Chisholm Trail and Glenrowan Road. The tobacco kiln is sited 10 degrees off a direct north–south orientation, with the door aperture situated in the western wall. This former entrance is at present closed off by timber and corrugated sheeting, presumably for safety reasons.

The western and eastern walls are 4.12 metres (13.5 ft) long and the northern and southern walls are 4.1 metres (13 ft) long, with the wall height averaging 4.25 metres (13.9 ft) above the present ground level. The single brick walls are constructed of moulded clay bricks approximately 220 by 110 by 70 millimetres (8.7 in × 4.3 in × 2.8 in), which is slightly smaller than a standard imperial brick of 9 x 4.5 x 3 inches (76 mm). The bricks are laid in a stretcher bond design with rather coarse mortar that finishes roughly flush to the outside of the brick. These brick walls are finished at the top with a timber frame and are then tied together internally by steel bolts 1.5 centimetres (0.59 in) thick and approximately 1 metre (3 ft 3 in) apart.

The roof is a pyramidal shape with a truncated apex to allow a square ventilator on top. The timber-framed roof is sheeted externally with corrugated iron, and has iron capping covering the four ridges. It is lined internally with an insulating material, possibly fibro cement sheeting. The eastern and western sides of the top ventilator are still attached to the apex of the roof. They are made of flat galvanized sheet and are also lined with the same insulating material as the roof. The sheeting on the western side of the ventilator clearly shows an imprint of the queen's head and the number 33 underneath. A shaped piece of iron lying inside the building indicates that the damper over this ventilator was also pyramidal in shape.

Although the external furnace area of the kiln has at some stage been dismantled and filled in, it can be located on the eastern side where ground subsidence reveals a round flue outlet. This is 1.5 metres (4 ft 11 in) from the northern edge of the building with 4.18 metres (13.7 ft) between the top of the brick wall and the top of the outlet. The diameter of the outlet is approximately 30 centimetres (12 in). The corrugated roof sheeting at the centre of the eastern wall has been cut back in two places and the metal in between bent down, indicating the former position of the chimney. A flat piece of iron attached to the left of this is probably the remains of a holding bracket for the chimney. Looking inside through the broken bricks on the western wall, it is possible to see a second matching flue outlet at a corresponding distance from the southern edge of the building. At a lower level, between these round outlets and the northern and southern walls, are two square holes indicating the flue inlets. Although no longer attached to the inlets and outlets, the remains of two iron flues still lie on the dirt floor, running across the barn and back again. They appear to be made out of iron sheeting fashioned into round pipes with telescopic sleeves joined to form the returns. Some remnants of timber tiers are also evident, mainly along the northern wall. These tiers are made of bush saplings.

The door to the kiln on the western wall is missing. The left hand jamb of a timber door frame is still in place, 1.7 metres (5 ft 7 in) from the northern wall. It is impossible to say exactly how big the door was because the rest of the frame and some bricks above and to the right of the door have become dislodged, thereby enlarging the opening.

== Heritage listing ==
Tobacco Kiln was listed on the Queensland Heritage Register on 27 September 2002 having satisfied the following criteria.

The place is important in demonstrating the evolution or pattern of Queensland's history.

The tobacco kiln, constructed c. 1933, is important physical evidence of an agricultural industry developed in response to community needs during the Great Depression. Both Queensland and Australian governments initiated trials to find suitable land for growing tobacco with the hope of easing high unemployment and boosting local economies. The Queensland government undertook many agricultural schemes of this nature during the Depression of the 1930s, many of which were short lived. It also reflects the recurring pattern in Queensland's history of developing agriculture as an important part of land settlement.

The place demonstrates rare, uncommon or endangered aspects of Queensland's cultural heritage.

The tobacco kiln is a rare remnant of Townsville's history given that this area is no longer a tobacco growing district. This kiln is particularly so because it does not appear to have been reused for other purposes. It still contains the remains of the original flues and tier poles.

The place is important in demonstrating the principal characteristics of a particular class of cultural places.

The tobacco kiln demonstrates the principal characteristics of flue curing techniques which were the most modern and scientific method available in the 1930s. Its design closely followed that recommended by the Senior Instructor in Agriculture through a contemporary statewide agricultural journal. The considerable capital investment it represented indicates either a faith in the potential of modern agricultural techniques or a desperate bid to survive in harsh economic times.
