= Saint Brigid's Church =

Saint Brigid's Church or St Brigid's Church may refer to:

Australia

- St Brigid's Church, Perth, Western Australia
- St Brigid's Church, Red Hill, Brisbane, Queensland
- St Brigid's Church, Rosewood, Queensland
- St Brigid's Church, Stuart, Queensland
- St Brigid's Roman Catholic Church, New South Wales

Canada

- Saint Brigid's Church (Ottawa)
- St. Brigid's Church, Prince Edward Island

Ireland

- St Brigid's Church, Clara, County Offaly
- St Brigid's Church of Ireland Church, Clara, County Offaly
- St Brigid's Church, Croghan, County Offaly
- St Brigid's Church, Deerpark, County Wicklow
- St Brigid's Church, Kilbride, County Wicklow
- St. Brigid's Church, Straffan, County Kildare
- St Brigid's Church, Talbotstown, County Wicklow

UK

- St Brigid's Church, Kilbirnie, Scotland

USA

- St. Brigid Roman Catholic Church (Manhattan)

== See also ==
- St Bridget's Church (disambiguation)
