= Oak Valley, Queensland =

Oak Valley
- Suburb
- Interactive map of Oak Valley
- Coordinates: 19.4099°S 146.8188°E
- Country: Australia
- State: Queensland
- LGA: City of Townsville
- Location: 12.9 km (8.0 mi) S of Wulguru; 15.8 km (9.8 mi) S of Annandale; 21.1 km (13.1 mi) S of Townsville CBD; 1,337 km (831 mi) NNW of Brisbane

Government
  - State electorate: Burdekin
  - Federal division: Kennedy

Area
  - Total: 16.8 km^{2} (6.5 sq mi)

Population
  - Total: 478 (2021 census)
  - Density: 28.45/km^{2} (73.69/sq mi)
- Time zone: UTC+10:00 (AEST)
- Postcode: 4811
Suburbs around Oak Valley
Mount Stuart	Roseneath	Brookhill
Mount Stuart	Oak Valley	Brookhill
Ross River	Ross River	Ross River

Oak Valley is a rural residential locality in the City of Townsville, Queensland, Australia. In the 2021 census, Oak Valley had a population of 478 people.

== Geography ==
The locality is loosely bounded to the north-east by the Flinders Highway and the Great Northern railway line.

Stanley is a neighbourhood in the locality (19.4166°S 146.8333°E).

== History ==
The neighbourhood of Stanley takes its name from the Stanley railway station, which was after railway engineer Henry Charles Stanley.

Antill Plains Aerodrome was a military airfield operated from 1942 to 1945 during World War II. It is now privately operated as Montpelier Airpark at 1259 Old Flinders Highway (19.42973°S 146.82842°E).

== Demographics ==
In the 2011 census, Oak Valley had a population of 420 people.

In the 2016 census, Oak Valley had a population of 487 people.

In the 2021 census, Oak Valley had a population of 478 people.

== Heritage listings ==
Oak Valley has a number of heritage-listed sites, including:

- 12 Chisholm Trail: Tobacco Kiln

== Education ==
There are no schools in Oak Valley. The nearest government primary school is Wulguru State School in Wulguru to the north-west. The nearest government secondary school is William Ross State High School in Annandale to the north-west.

== Facilities ==
The Townsville City Council operate a mobile library service which visits the fire brigade shed at Oak Valley every second Wednesday afternoon.
