= No. 3 Fighter Sector RAAF =

No. 3 Fighter Sector (3FS) was a Royal Australian Air Force (RAAF) unit formed at Townsville Grammar School, Townsville, Australia on 25 February 1942. No. 3FS was responsible for fighter aircraft control and coordination for the Townsville region. The Women's Auxiliary Australian Air Force members of 3FS were billeted at St Anne's Girls School, Townsville.

The role of 3FS was to co-ordinate all of the intelligence information from the various D/F stations and VAOC posts, decide on the most appropriate response and then advise the appropriate fighter or bomber squadrons to respond. 3FS was in telephone and radio contact with all of the anti-aircraft, searchlight, RDF and HF/DF stations in the Townsville area.

In 1942, a new headquarters for No. 3FS was under construction at Wulguru, Queensland, Stuart, Townsville. The site was a full integrated camp site with its own power house, barracks, kitchens, septic system and recreation hall. There were as many as 62 different buildings in 3FS HQ. The camp was on the side of a hill near Mount Stuart, on the west side of the road to Charters Towers. It can still be seen today on the hill on the opposite side of the Stuart Shopping centre (Wulguru).

No. 3FS was renamed to 103 Fighter Control Unit (103 FCU) on 7 March 1944. The Stuart complex became fully operational on 20 December 1944. The main operations building was made of 30-centimetre (12 in) thick reinforced concrete designed to withstand a direct bomb hit. It had a mezzanine floor and was air-conditioned. 3 Fighter Sector Headquarters comprised 32 rooms in the large rectangular concrete building with caneite partitions forming various passageways. The building still stands today and is 60 by 42 feet (18.3 m × 12.8 m). The mezzanine floor has long since disappeared.

All air raid warnings were initiated from this bunker by red, yellow and white flares.

103 FCU was disbanded in Townsville on 21 January 1945.

Modern day use of the site has apparently been hindered by the presence of old tunnels that were in use during World War II.

There was also HQ located in North Ward, Townsville.

After the war, the buildings were used as an immigration and migration hostel. The Buildings were still furnished at the time. In 1961 it was purchased by James Cook University of Queensland and was used as a temporary accommodation for students while the residential halls at douglas were being built. The Bunker itself was still furnished with communication and signals equipment. A few years later the bunkers insides were destroyed by fire. In 1971 the rest of the buildings were demolished. The Site is still owned by James Cook University even though the only building on the site is the bunker, except for all the old slabs on the site.

The western side of the bunker

The columns in the main room of the bunker

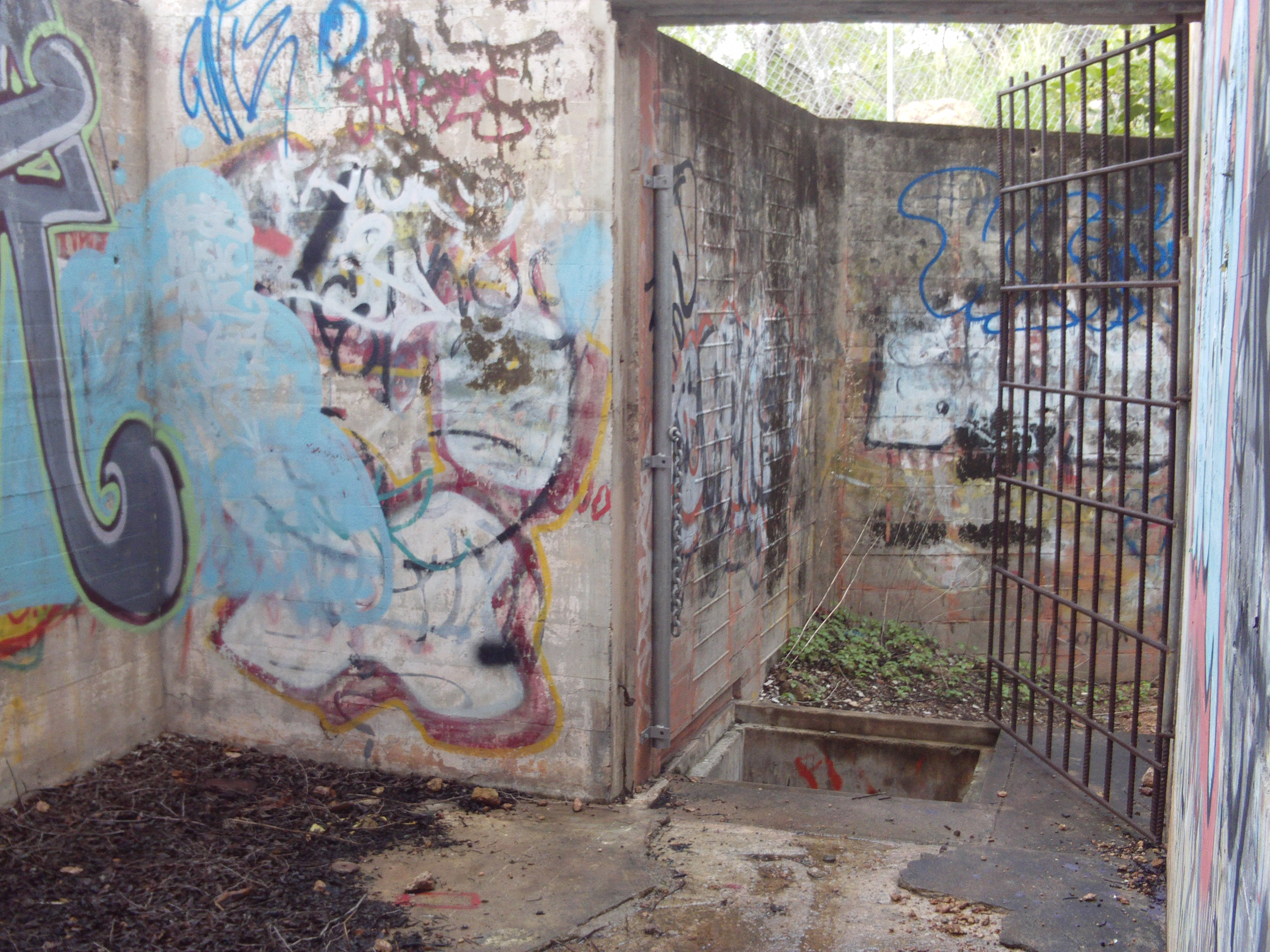
The main entrance on the eastern side

== See also ==
- Operations and Signals Bunker, Wulguru
- Green Street bunker
