= Mount Stuart, Queensland =

Mount Stuart Queensland
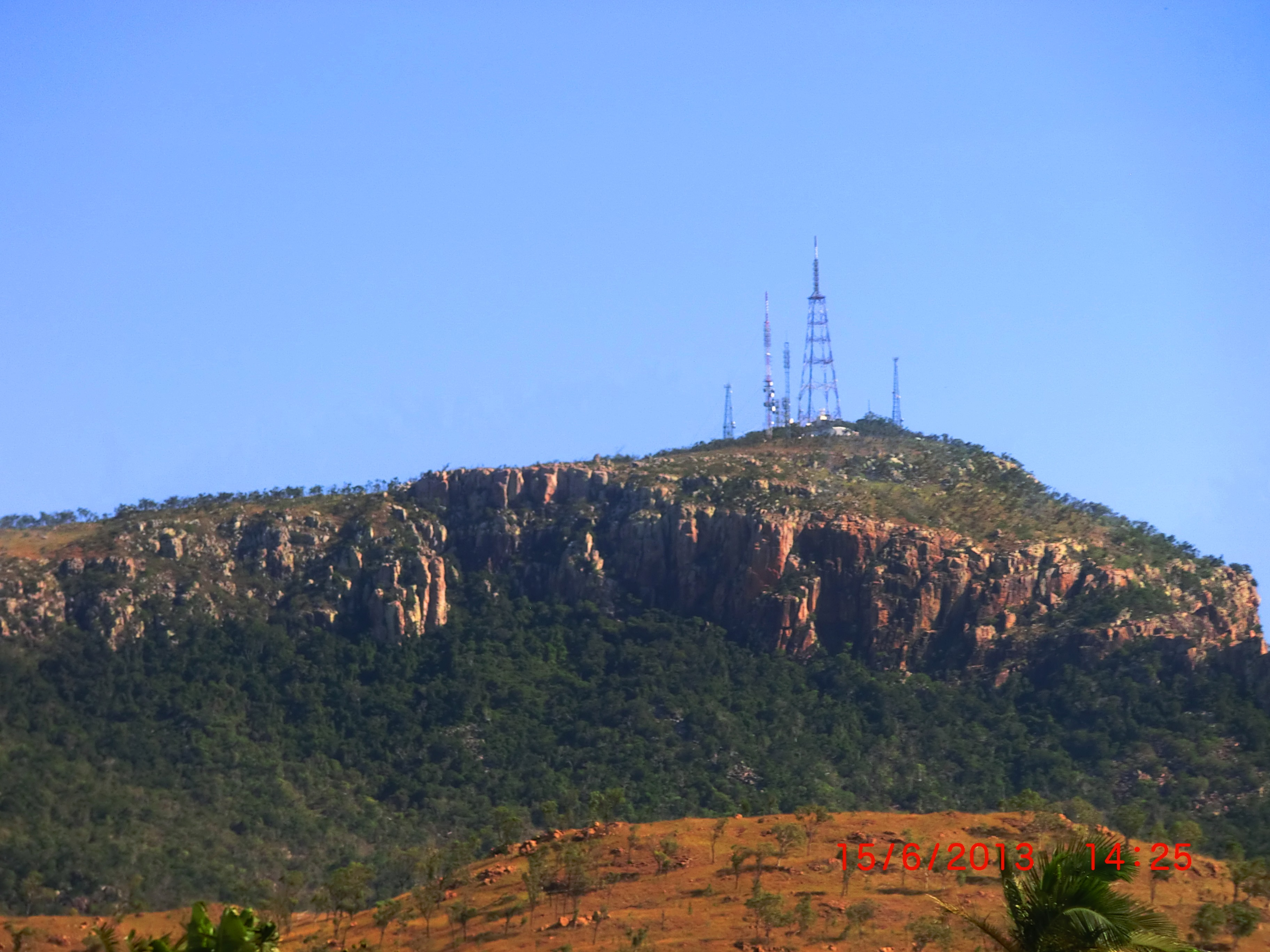
- Mount Stuart with its telecommunictions towers

- Coordinates: 19.3788°S 146.7758°E
- Population: 0 (2021 census)
  - Density: 0.000/km^{2} (0.000/sq mi)
- Postcode(s): 4811
- Area: 70.1 km^{2} (27.1 sq mi)
- Time zone: AEST (UTC+10:00)
- Location: 14.2 km (9 mi) SW of Townsville CBD; 1,366 km (849 mi) NNW of Brisbane
- LGA(s): City of Townsville
- State electorate(s): Burdekin
- Federal division(s): Kennedy
Suburbs around Mount Stuart:
Condon	Douglas	Murray
Rasmussen	Mount Stuart	Roseneath
Kelso	Ross River	Oak Valley

Mount Stuart is a locality in the City of Townsville, Queensland, Australia. In the 2021 census, Mount Stuart had "no people or a very low population".

== Geography ==
The Ross River forms the western boundary of the locality. The Ross River Dam is at the south-west of the locality which forms Lake Ross which is the south-western boundary of the locality. The terrain is mountainous rising to the peak of Mount Stuart (584 metres) (19.3433°S 146.7805°E).

Almost all of the locality is within the Mount Stuart Training Area used by the Australian Army; it is nearby to the army's Lavarack Barracks.

Despite the name, the Douglas Water Treatment Plant is within the north-west of the locality of Mount Stuart (19.3324°S 146.7314°E).

== History ==
The mountain and hence the locality were named after Clarendon Stuart, a surveyor who undertook the first survey of the Town of Bowen in 1861. He also surveyed the first allotments in Townsville in 1865. In 1868 he worked in Gympie as the Gold Commissioner. Then he moved to New South Wales working in the office of the New South Wales Surveyor-General in 1884. From 1887 to his retirement in 1892, he was a clerk and schoolmaster at Bathurst Gaol. He was also a well-respected amateur artist who held several exhibitions. He died in Sydney in 1912.

== Demographics ==
In the 2016 census, Mount Stuart had "no people or a very low population".

In the 2021 census, Mount Stuart "no people or a very low population".

== Education ==
There are no schools in Mount Stuart. The nearest government primary schools are Weir State School in Thuringowa Central to the north and Wulguru State School in Wulguru to the north-east. The nearest government secondary schools are Thuringowa State High School in neighbouring Condon to the north-west and William Ross State High School in Annandale to the north-east.

== Attractions ==
Mount Stuart Lookout is at the top of the mountain (19.3432°S 146.7810°E) with views over the Townsville area. It is accessed via Mount Stuart Road which commences at Stuart Drive in neighbouring Roseneath (19.3609°S 146.8372°E). Telecommunication towers are located at the lookout.

Townsville City Council operates tours of the Douglas Water Treatment Plant.
