= Cluden, Queensland =

Cluden
- Suburb
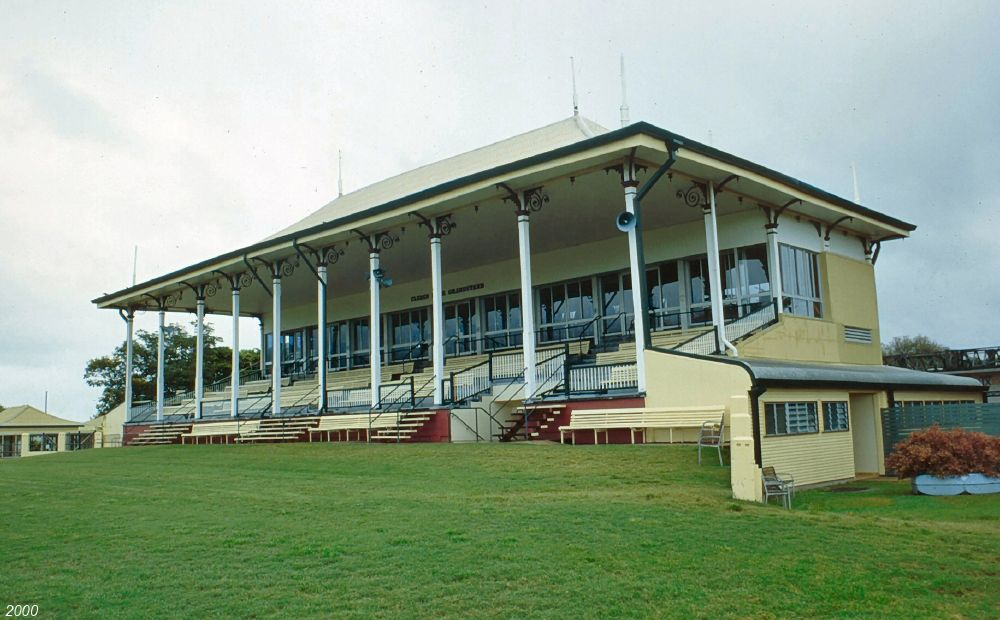
- Grandstand, Cluden Racecourse, 2000

- Interactive map of Cluden
- Coordinates: 19.3122°S 146.8308°E
- Country: Australia
- State: Queensland
- City: Townsville
- LGA: City of Townsville
- Location: 8.5 km (5.3 mi) S of Townsville CBD; 1,330 km (830 mi) NNW of Brisbane

Government
  - State electorate: Mundingburra
  - Federal division: Dawson

Area
  - Total: 6.4 km^{2} (2.5 sq mi)

Population
  - Total: 413 (2021 census)
  - Density: 64.5/km^{2} (167.1/sq mi)
- Time zone: UTC+10:00 (AEST)
- Postcode: 4811
Suburbs around Cluden
| Oonoonba | Stuart | Stuart |
| Idalia | Cluden | Stuart |
| Anndandale | Wulguru | Stuart |

Cluden is an outer southern suburb of Townsville in the City of Townsville, Queensland, Australia. In the 2021 census, Cluden had a population of 413 people.

== Geography ==
The Bruce Highway passes through the south-western corner. South Townsville Road runs along part of the south-western boundary, while Townsville Connection Road runs along another section of the south-western boundary. Townsville Port Road passes through the south-eastern corner.

== History ==
The suburb takes its name from a property owned by James Gordon (1822-1904), Sub-Collector of Customs in Townsville from 1865. The name likely refers to Cluden Water, a stream in Scotland near his birthplace in Dumfries.

The presence of the Cluden railway station (19.31691°S 146.82333°E) on the North Coast railway line prompted the relocation of the racecourse from central Townsville to a new site near the railway station called Cluden Racecourse to enable people from a wider area to attend the races through the convenience of travelling by rail. The railway station has subsequently closed.

== Demographics ==
In the 2011 census, Cluden had a population of 509 people.

In the 2016 census, Cluden had a population of 427 people.

In the 2021 census, Cluden had a population of 413 people.

== Heritage listings ==
The grandstand, former totalisator building and main entrance gates at Cluden Racecourse at 1 Racecourse Road (19.322°S 146.8208°E) are listed on the Queensland Heritage Register.

== Education ==
There are no schools in Cluden. The nearest government primary school is Oonoonba State School in neighbouring Idalia to the west. The nearest government secondary school is William Ross State High School in neighbouring Annandale to the south-west.
