= St Bridget's Church =

St Bridget's Church or Church of St Bridget may refer to:

== Finland ==
- St. Bridget's Church, Vihti
- St Bridget's Church, Halikko

== United Kingdom ==
- St Bridget's Church, Brigham, Cumbria, England
- St Bridget's Church, Calder Bridge, Cumbria, England
- Church of St Bridget, Chelvey, Brockley, Somerset, England
- Church of Saint Bridget, Liverpool, England
- St Bridget's Church, West Kirby, Wirral, Chester, England
- St Bridget's Kirk, Dalgety Bay, Fife, Scotland
- St. Bridget's Church, Skenfrith, Wales

== United States ==
- Church of St. Bridget-Catholic, De Graff, Minnesota, United States

== See also ==
- Saint Brigid's Church (disambiguation)
