= Operations and Signals Bunker, Wulguru =

Operations and Signals Bunker
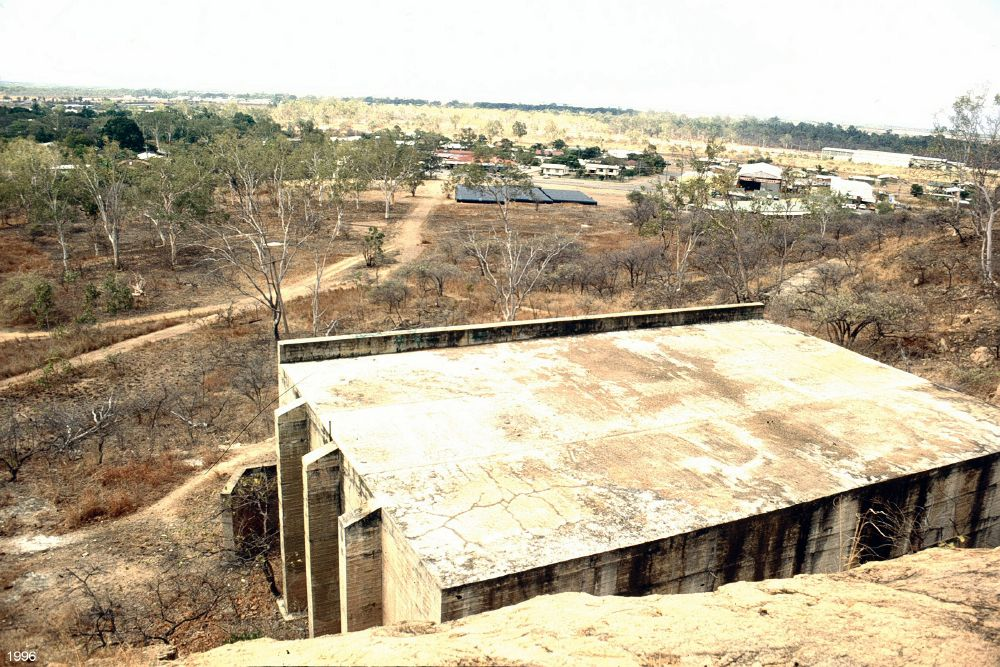
- Operations and Signals Bunker (former), 1996

- Location within Queensland Location within Australia
- 19.3349°S 146.8245°E
- Location: Off Stuart Drive, Wulguru, City of Townsville, Queensland, Australia

History
- Design period: 1939–1945 (World War II)
- Built: 1942–1944

Queensland Heritage Register
- Official name: Operations and Signals Bunker (former), James Cook University, RAAF No.3 Fighter Sector Headquarters (3FSHQ), Stuart Immigration Hostel
- Type: state heritage (built, archaeological)
- Designated: 28 August 1998
- Reference no.: 601708
- Significant period: 1942–1943 (fabric); 1940s (historical)
- Significant components: camouflage net securing points, machinery/plant/equipment – communications, bunker – concrete, slab/s – concrete

Operations and Signals Bunker is a heritage-listed signal station off Stuart Drive, Wulguru (formerly in Stuart), City of Townsville, Queensland, Australia. It was built from 1942 to 1944. It is also known as James Cook University, RAAF No.3 Fighter Sector Headquarters (3FSHQ), and Stuart Immigration Hostel. It was added to the Queensland Heritage Register on 28 August 1998.

== History ==
The former Operations and Signals Bunker (3FSHQ) was constructed between 1942 and 1944 for No 3 Fighter Sector Headquarters of the Royal Australian Air Force. Soon after moving to the site in late 1944 the operations of No 3 Fighter Sector Headquarters was subsumed into Air Defence Headquarters operations.

The increase in Japanese military activity in Asia in the late 1930s led the Australian Government to establish air bases in the north of Australia. The Department of Defence began negotiations with the Townsville City Council to transfer the Garbutt aerodrome to the Australian Government in early 1939. The acquisition was completed on 12 December 1940 and construction of three, 5,000 feet (1,500 m), sealed runways began in 1941.

Japanese military activity in the Pacific region increased after the bombing of Pearl Harbor on 7 December 1941. Faced with the threat of invasion the Australian and American Governments began to develop a major military base in the Townsville Region.

The Garbutt runways, designed for B17 bombers, were completed in February 1942, just prior to the arrival of units of the 5th Air Force, United States Army Air Force. Additional bomber bases were established at Charters Towers and Cloncurry and a number of airstrips for fighter aircraft were constructed between Townsville and Charters Towers.

3FSHQ was first established in temporary accommodation at Townsville Grammar School on 25 February 1942. 3FSHQ Townsville was formed to support airborne units located in the North Queensland area. As the war extended to the islands north of New Guinea, its operational area enlarged to cover the area stretching from Rockhampton in the south to Mount Isa in the west and New Guinea in the north. 3FSHQ controlled fighter squadron operations and coordinated anti-aircraft defences. Radio watches for bomber and reconnaissance aircraft were also maintained from the Operations Centre.

3FSHQ was also connected by telephone and radio to anti-aircraft guns and searchlights, and with Radio direction finder stations and high frequency direction finding (HF/DF) stations in the Townsville and Charters Towers area. The role of high frequency directional radio stations was to assist fighter pilots to get their bearings during airborne patrols. The station was linked by telephone to RAAF Headquarters in Melbourne and was responsible for keeping the RAAF Command informed of all developments. The Operations Centre was also responsible for activating air raid warnings. It also provided position plots for courier and civil aircraft operating between Brisbane and New Guinea.

While 3FSHQ was located at the Grammar School from 1942 to 1944 the location was not ideal because it was vulnerable to air attack. Planning for the construction of a new Fighter Sector Headquarters began in 1942. The new complex was constructed on the lower, eastern slopes of Mount Stuart on 68 acres (28 ha) of land requisitioned by the Australian Government in August 1942. The site was regarded as ideal as it was some distance from the main airfields and the public eye, but still close enough to the various other installations it liaised with. In the event of an enemy raid, its position was such that it would have been difficult to attack, and the area's natural camouflage would have made it difficult to locate.

Construction of the complex began in late 1942 with the Operations and Signals Bunker ready by early 1943. However, by November 1943 the bunker, identified as a semi-underground building because all cabling was laid underground, was not yet occupied because associated accommodation facilities had not been completed. The delay related to the fact that the complex was located some distance from the airfield and there was some question as to whether the facility could provide briefing to air crews in an adequate time frame. Eventually the site become operational in late 1944.

The bunker itself was fully airconditioned and housed its own power plant. The interior had a steel mezzanine floor splitting it into two levels and was divided into 32 rooms and passageways by caneite partitions. Located within the building was the Operations Room, Engine Room, RDF Filter Room, Voluntary Air Observer Corp (VAOC) Liaison Room, Main Operations Room Dais, Aircraft Movements Section, RDF Supervisors Room, Signal Officers Room, W/T Workshop and PMG Switch Room.

The Administration Section was also moved to the Stuart site and commenced functioning on 29 December 1944. On 25 January 1945 the Royal Australian Airforce established their Air Defence Headquarters in the Stuart complex; from where they operated until 1947.

The complex, except for the bunker, was utilised after the war as an immigration depot and migrant hostel. Additional huts were placed on the site to provide more accommodation for migrants who arrived in large numbers after the war. Many of these migrants have made their homes in North Queensland.

In 1961 James Cook University of North Queensland purchased the site for student accommodation while the residential halls at Douglas were under construction. The bunker was still partially furnished at the time the property was purchased by the university. There was a large mapping table in the main room complete with maps and maps on the wall still had marker pins in them. The switchboards and other communication equipment were still largely intact. Photographs, taken at the time, were deposited with the university.

Soon after, in 1962 or 1963, the interior of the bunker was destroyed by fire. In the early 1970s the site was vacated and the barracks either demolished or removed. The property is still under the control of the university although the bunker is the only remaining structure on the site.

== Description ==
The former Operations and Signals Bunker is a rectangular two-storeyed concrete bunker set into the hillside at the base of Mount Stuart. The site is set back from Stuart Drive, which becomes the highway west to Charters Towers, and is about ten kilometres south-west of Townsville's city centre.

The bunker, measuring about 18 by 13 metres (59 ft × 43 ft), has a flat concrete roof, engaged piers to the side walls and a boarded formwork finish. Remnants of its external camouflage colour scheme, chosen to blend with the pink granite of the hill, are still evident.

The bunker consists of a main room which is two stories in height, with smaller separate rooms attached to the front. The main room retains evidence of the mezzanine floor, air-conditioning ducts and wc's.

The front section contains some six separate smaller rooms of two levels. Access to the four rooms at the centre is from the exterior and access to the two rooms at the western end is from the main room. The lower of the two western rooms contains the large metal frame of the fuse and telephone cable board with some fuses still visible, which is the only surviving piece of equipment in the structure. Part of the floor of this room appears to be rubble, filling a small tunnel for cables.

To either side of the bunker are two circular structures, possibly bases for communication aerials or anchors for the camouflage net for the bunker. They are some four metre wide and constructed of low stone walls with a conical concrete cap.

Between the bunker, the creek to the north-west and the road to the north-east are several concrete slabs, concrete steps and scatters of building material and other artefacts. These are remnants of other structures of the complex, possibly ablutions blocks and hot water boiler stands.

== Heritage listing ==
The former Operations and Signals Bunker was listed on the Queensland Heritage Register on 28 August 1998 having satisfied the following criteria.

The place is important in demonstrating the evolution or pattern of Queensland's history.

The former Operations and Signals Bunker at Stuart, constructed in 1942–1943, is significant as the former Headquarters of the Operations Section of No 3 Fighter Sector Headquarters (3FSHQ), who controlled fighter operations and anti-aircraft defences through North Queensland and New Guinea. Occupied by the Royal Australian Air Force (RAAF) in January 1945, the Former Operations and Signals Bunker played a pivotal role as the key communications centre for Allied Air Forces, operating out of Townsville during the final months of the Pacific War. The Former Operations and Signals Bunker is one of a number of WWII structures and complexes which survive in the Townsville area, demonstrating the substantial role the region, and particularly Townsville, played in the war in the Pacific.

The place has potential to yield information that will contribute to an understanding of Queensland's history.

Surrounding the bunker are remnants and material scatter from other structures of the complex, which have the potential to yield further information which will contribute to the understanding of the site.

The place is important in demonstrating the principal characteristics of a particular class of cultural places.

The exterior of the concrete bunker is a substantially intact example of its type and retains evidence of the camouflage paint scheme. Part of the fuse and telephone cable board is the only internal equipment to survive.

The place has a strong or special association with a particular community or cultural group for social, cultural or spiritual reasons.

The former Operations and Signals Bunker During has special association for the numbers of European migrants who were accommodated in the complex after WWII, many of whom have remained in North Queensland. The Former Operations and Signals Bunker is also associated with James Cook University, when, during the 1960s, in the foundation years of university, the complex was used as temporary halls of residence for students.
