= Antill Plains Aerodrome =

Antill Plains Aerodrome
- Townsville, Queensland in Australia

Site information
- Owner: Australian Air Board
- Operator: Royal Australian Air Force; United States Army Air Forces
- Controlled by: Fifth Air Force

Location
- Shown within Queensland Antill Plains Aerodrome (Australia)
- Coordinates: 19°26′47″S 146°49′18″E

Site history
- Built: 1942
- In use: 1942 - 1945
- Battles/wars: Pacific War

Airfield information
Runways
Direction	Length and surface
E/W	Gravel
NE/SW	Gravel

Antill Plains Aerodrome was a World War II military aerodrome located 19.38 kilometres (12.04 mi) south of Townsville, Queensland, Australia. It takes its name from the nearby Antill Plains railway station (19.4285°S 146.8363°E), which takes its name from pioneer Edmund Spencer Antill, who established the Jarvisfield pastoral run in 1862. It is now at 1259 Old Flinders Highway, Oak Valley. It is often misspelled as Anthill Plains due to the termite mounds in the area (locally known as anthills).

== History ==
The aerodrome was constructed in 1942, during World War II, for the Royal Australian Air Force as part of a group of airfields to be used as aircraft dispersal fields in the event of Imperial Japanese attack on the Townsville area. It was leased to the United States Army Air Forces.

The aerodrome had two runways, one running east–west and the other northeast–southwest. It was abandoned after the war.

Units

- 33rd Bombardment Squadron of the 22nd Bomb Group – (Martin B-26 Marauder's) 7 April 1942 – 20 July 1942.

Aircraft crashes

- 12 May 1942 – Martin B-26 Marauder, Serial Number #40-1477 crashed on landing.

== Current use ==
Today, the airfield is in regular use by the Barrier Reef Adventure Trikes (B.R.A.T.S) who fly their ultralights. There are numerous hangars and a model aero club at the end of runway 27. The airfield is now owned and operated by Andrew Hicks and is referred to locally as Montpelier Airpark. It is the closest ultra-light airfield to town of the three in the area.

== See also ==
- United States Army Air Forces in Australia (World War II)
- List of airports in Queensland
