= Stuart, Queensland =

Stuart Townsville, Queensland
- Coordinates: 19.3216°S 146.8547°E
- Population: 1,576 (2021 census)
  - Density: 29.57/km^{2} (76.58/sq mi)
- Postcode(s): 4811
- Area: 53.3 km^{2} (20.6 sq mi)
- Time zone: AEST (UTC+10:00)
- Location: 13.4 km (8 mi) SSE of Townsville CBD; 358 km (222 mi) S of Cairns; 1,327 km (825 mi) NNW of Brisbane
- LGA(s): City of Townsville
- State electorate(s): Mundingburra
- Federal division(s): Dawson; Kennedy
Suburbs around Stuart:
South Townsville; Railway Estate	Coral Sea	Cape Cleveland
Onnoonba; Cluden	Stuart	Nome
Wulguru; Roseneath	Brookhill	Julago

Stuart is a rural coastal suburb in the City of Townsville, Queensland, Australia. In the 2021 census, Stuart had a population of 1,576 people.

== Geography ==
Stuart is bounded to the north-east by the Coral Sea. The North Coast railway line forms the western boundary, with the Stuart railway station serving the suburb. The Bruce Highway passes from the south-east to the north-west through the suburb. The Flinders Highway passes from the south-west to its junction with the Bruce Highway. Townsville Connection Road exits to the west, and Townsville Port Road exits to the north-west.

Most of this large suburb is undeveloped land with the developed land mostly used for infrastructure and industrial purposes. There is a small amount of residential development.

The neighbourhood of Partington is within Stuart at 19.35°S 146.85°E. It takes its name from a former railway siding on the North Coast railway line, which in turn was named after Joseph Partington, a local brickmaker.

== History ==
The suburb takes its name from the railway station, which was originally called Ayr Junction railway station in 1902, then Stewarts Creek railway station in 1938 and then Stuart railway station in 1939. It is thought that Stewart was just a temporary misspelling of Stuart and that the intention was to name the area after the first district surveyor appointed in 1865, Clarendon Stuart (1833-1912).

Stewart's Creek Provisional School opened on 18 May 1891, becoming Stewart's Creek State School in 1901. In 1939, it was renamed Stuart State School. It was closed on 31 December 2013, having been assessed as unviable with an enrolment of 80+ students. It was at 10 Dwyer Street (19.34793°S 146.84179°E). Its website was partially archived. In May 2025, the school site was offered for sale.

In December 1942, two classrooms of the Stuart State School on the outskirts of Townsville were used by the Army as the main Army Signals Communication Centre in North Queensland. The unit later moved to a concrete bunker at Roseneath.

== Demographics ==
In the 2011 census, Stuart had a population of 1,051 people.

In the 2016 census, Stuart had a population of 1,386 people.

In the 2021 census, Stuart had a population of 1,576 people.

== Heritage listings ==
Stuart has a number of heritage-listed sites, including:

- Stewart's Creek Gaol (the historic buildings within the present Townsville Correction Centre), Centenary Drive, off Dwyer Street
- former Operations and Signals Bunker, Off Stuart Drive (now in Wulguru)
- St Brigid's Church, 523 Stuart Drive

== Facilities ==
Infrastructure in Stuart includes:

- Townsville Correctional Centre
- Stuart landfill and waste transfer station

Industries in Stuart include:

- Mount Stuart Power Station
- Sun Metals Zinc Refinery

== Education ==
There are no schools in Stuart. The nearest government primary schools are Townsville South State School in neighbouring South Townsville to the north-west, Oonooba State School in Idalia to the west, and Wulguru State School in neighbouring Wulguru to the south-west. The nearest government secondary school is William Ross State High School in Annandale to the west.
