= St Brigid's Church, Stuart =

Church building in Queensland, Australia

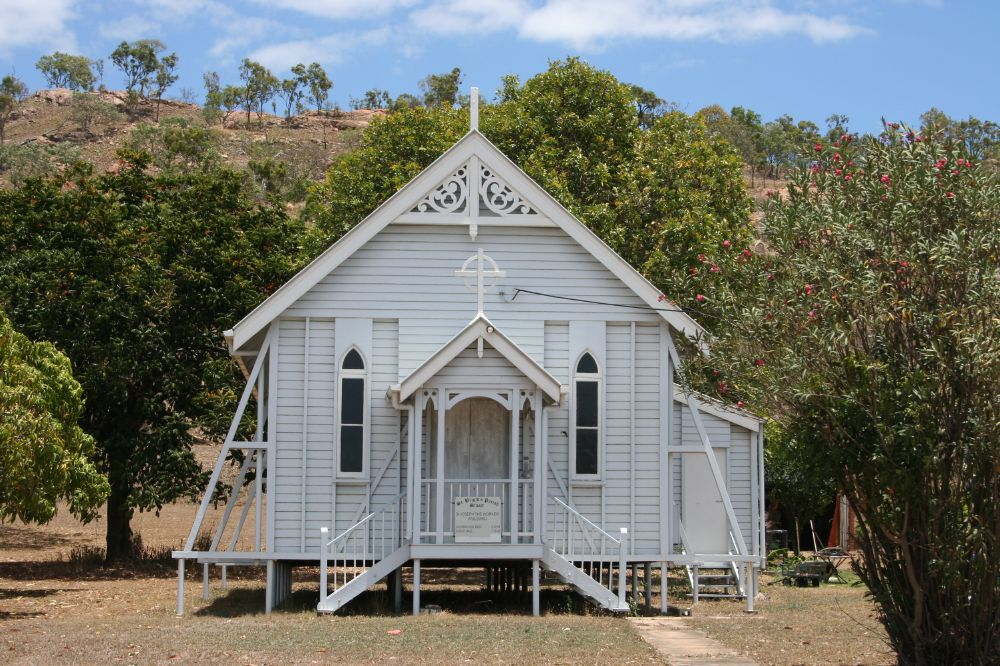
- St Brigid's Church, 2008
- St Brigid's Church, Stuart
- 19°20′56″S 146°50′05″E
- Address: 523 Stuart Drive, Stuart, City of Townsville, Queensland
- Country: Australia
- Denomination: Roman Catholic

History
- Dedication: Saint Brigid
- Dedicated: 2 October 1904 by Right Rev. Dr Murray, Vicar Apostolic of Cooktown

Architecture
- Style: Gothic Revival
- Years built: 1904
- Construction cost: A£225

Administration
- Diocese: Townsville
- Parish: Townsville

Queensland Heritage Register
- Official name: St Brigid's Church
- Type: State heritage (built)
- Designated: 21 October 1992
- Reference no.: 600881
- Significant period: 1880s-1900s (historical); 1900s (fabric)
- Significant components: Church, views to, furniture/fittings

St Brigid's Church is a heritage-listed Roman Catholic church at 523 Stuart Drive, Stuart, City of Townsville, Queensland, Australia. It was built in 1904. It was added to the Queensland Heritage Register on 21 October 1992.

== History ==
St Brigid's Church at Stewart's Creek (later Stuart) was constructed in 1904 by Townsville builders Doig & Ritchie, who also supplied 8 timber pews. Messrs Rooney and Co of Townsville (builders, sawmillers and joiners) supplied the pine altar and other furnishings.

Title to the initially 50 acre (20.23ha) site was acquired by Fr William Mason Walsh, the parish priest at Townsville, in 1885, but it took nearly 20 years before a church was erected and furnished, at a cost of about £225 – illustrating the relative poverty of the local Catholic community. The building was opened on 2 October 1904 by the Right Rev. Dr Murray, Vicar Apostolic of Cooktown, who had journeyed from Cairns to Townsville especially for the purpose.

In 1904, Stewart's Creek was under the administration of St Joseph's on The Strand, which still lay within the Diocese of Rockhampton. Later it came under the jurisdiction of the parishes of West End and then Mundingburra, before Stewart's Creek was established as a separate parish in 1945. Father TA Kelly was appointed the first pastor of Stewart's Creek, and a presbytery was erected adjacent to the church in 1946, at a cost of £1,680.

The church has been painted many times since 1904 and the wooden stumps were replaced in 1974 with steel pipe stumps. The care with which this building has been maintained since 1904 has preserved its integrity.

== Description ==
St Brigid's Church (1904) stands in a semi-rural setting facing Flinders Highway (Stuart Drive) in the suburb of Stuart. It is a traditional timber and corrugated iron building with Gothic features of the Federation era. Chamferboards are attached to the exposed stud frame which is diagonally braced and strengthened additionally by timber buttresses. Plain bargeboards and a decorative fretwork panel highlights the frontal gable. Two sets of railed wooden stairs lead to a decorative open porch. A sacristy is attached to the north side and the whole structure is supported by modern steel stumps.

An elaborately carved wooden altar, flanked by a pair of marble angels, dominates the interior. Pointed windows, a timber vaulted ceiling and the original wooden pews complete the interior furnishing.

The 1946 presbytery is located within the churchyard, approximately 10 metres (33 ft) north-west of the church. It is an idiosyncratic structure, having single layer 4-inch (100 mm) brick external walls in stretcher bond set high on a substantial concrete column and beam frame. In plan it comprises a rectangular brick core of three non-connecting rooms, each of which has front and back French doors with Arctic glass and fanlight above, opening to a wide encircling verandah. This verandah was open initially but has been enclosed with fibrous cement sheeting and windows, and lined internally with fibreboard. The street elevation has a raised cross centrally mounted. The whole is surmounted by a hipped roof of corrugated metal sheeting. The upper level is accessed on the southern side via a set of steps with a metal balustrade.

The church grounds are grassed and contain a number of mature trees, including a grey bloodwood (Eucalyptus clarksonia), white fig (Ficus virens), black bean (Castanospermum australe) and African mahogany (Khaya senegalensis). Toward the front of the churchyard, between the church and the presbytery, is a steel-framed bell tower and bell.

== Heritage listing ==
St Brigid's Church was listed on the Queensland Heritage Register on 21 October 1992 having satisfied the following criteria.

The place is important in demonstrating the evolution or pattern of Queensland's history.

St Brigid's Church at Stuart is important historically for its association with the expansion of the Catholic Church in the Townsville area in the late 19th/early 20th centuries, during the consolidation of Townsville as a major regional centre.

The place is important in demonstrating the principal characteristics of a particular class of cultural places.

Though similar to Catholic churches at Brandon and Torrens Creek, St Brigid's Church at Stuart remains highly intact and is a particularly fine example of a gabled, exposed-frame timber church with a timber vaulted ceiling and Gothic motifs, including lancet windows.

It retains most of the original furnishings, including the carved timber altar and timber pews.

The place is important because of its aesthetic significance.

It remains an exceptional timber church, combining style and appeal with simplicity. It contributes pleasingly to the landscape along the Flinders Highway.
