= Annandale State School =

Annandale State Primary School

Location
- Yolanda Drv (cnr Oleander St), Townsville QLD, Australia; 19°19′S 146°47′E

Information
- Type: Primary school
- Motto: Creating the future
- Established: 1998
- Principal: Trevor Buchanan
- Website: https://annandaless.eq.edu.au/

Annandale State School is a public, co-educational, primary school, located in the Townsville suburb of Annandale, in Queensland, Australia. It is administered by the Department of Education, with an enrolment of 715 students and a teaching staff of 55, as of 2023. The school serves students from Prep to Year 6.

== History ==
Annandale opened on 22 January 1998, with Julie Kornman, who served as the first principal of Annandale State school from its founding in 1998 until 2002.

In 2005, the schools 'G block' was constructed, at the cost of 1.4 million; the Australian Government funded $500,000, while the State Government funded approximately $955,000.

On 31 August 2017, the school officially swore in a police officer, to monitor the school.

== Programs ==
Annandale offers a wide-ranging curriculum for students from Prep to Year 6. Students complete four units of study per year and are grouped according to their age. Major foci for the next three years include the development of whole school approaches to Gifted Education, ICT, Literacy and Outcomes planning.

Students may also elect to participate in the school sport and music programs. Annandale participates in many sports including soccer, netball, rugby league, and hockey. Students may also elect to learn a musical instrument such as the violin, trumpet, flute, or drums.
