= Mount Stuart (Queensland) =

Mountain in Queensland, Australia

- Mandilgun
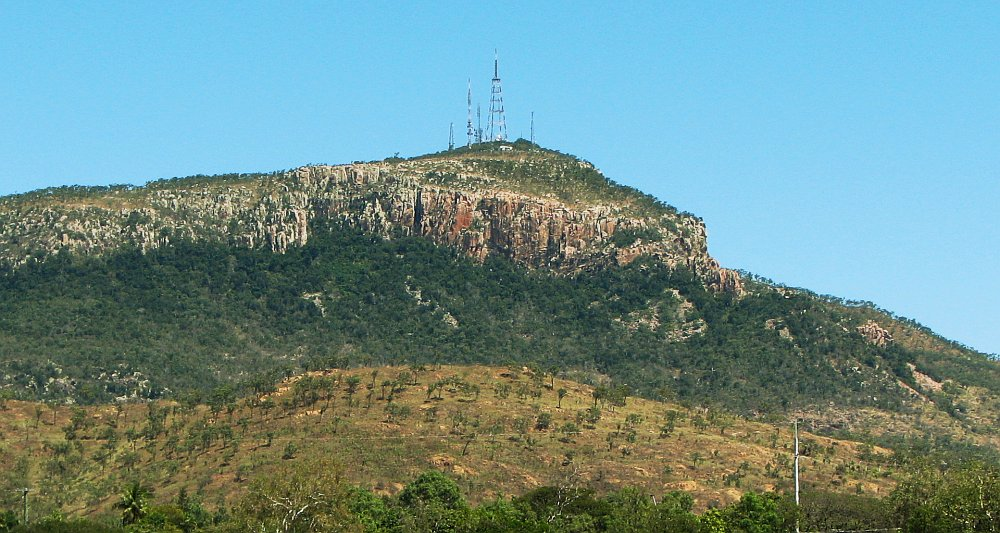
- Mount Stuart, overlooking Townsville, Queensland.

Highest point
- Elevation: 584 m (1,916 ft)
- Coordinates: 19.3433°S 146.7805°E

Geography
- Location: Mount Stuart, City of Townsville, Queensland, Australia

Climbing
- Easiest route: Mount Stuart Road

Mount Stuart is a mountain in the locality of Mount Stuart in the City of Townsville, Queensland, Australia. It overlooks Townsville with an elevation of 584 metres.

It was named for Clarendon Stuart (1833–1912), from 1859 Townsville's first district surveyor.

Mount Stuart is used for commercial and ABC Queensland television transmission, it was also used as a Bureau of Meteorology radar station until late 2011, where it was moved to Hervey Range.

Mount Stuart overlooks Townsville's Lavarack Barracks, a major military base, which is home to the 3rd Brigade of the Australian Army.

Mount Stuart is a popular outdoor recreational area, including trail running, mountain biking and rock climbing. The lookout at the top can be accessed via Mount Stuart Road from Stuart Drive in Roseneath.
