= Wulguru, Queensland =

Wulguru
- Suburb
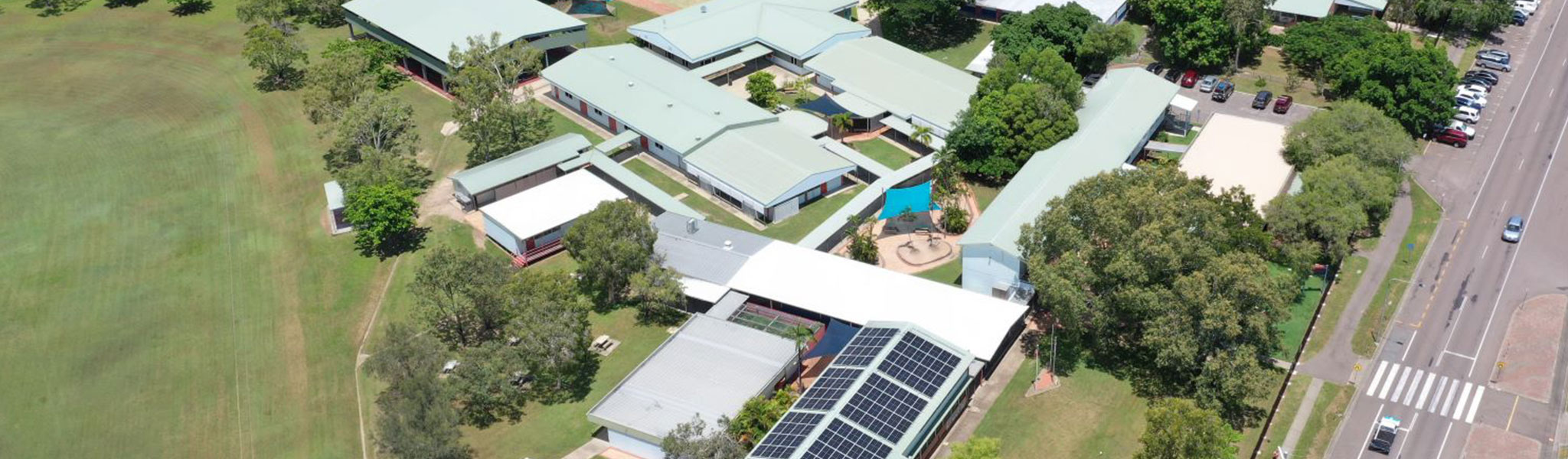
- Wulguru State School, circa 2022

- Interactive map of Wulguru
- Coordinates: 19.3291°S 146.8177°E
- Country: Australia
- State: Queensland
- City: Townsville
- LGA: City of Townsville
- Location: 9.5 km (5.9 mi) S of Townsville CBD; 1,327 km (825 mi) NNW of Brisbane

Government
  - State electorate: Mundingburra
  - Federal division: Dawson

Area
  - Total: 2.9 km^{2} (1.1 sq mi)

Population
  - Total: 4,389 (2021 census)
  - Density: 1,513/km^{2} (3,920/sq mi)
- Time zone: UTC+10:00 (AEST)
- Postcode: 4811
Suburbs around Wulguru
Annandale	Idalia	Cluden
Murray	Wulguru	Stuart
Murray	Roseneath	Stuart

Wulguru is an outer southern suburb of Townsville in the City of Townsville, Queensland, Australia. In the 2021 census, Wulguru had a population of 4,389 people.

== Geography ==
The suburb is bounded to the west by the Lavarack Barracks to the west, University Road (Bruce Highway) to the north, the Cluden Racecourse to the north-west, and by the North Coast railway line to the east. Townsville Connection Road runs through from south-east to north-east, and then along the north-eastern boundary.

The suburb is mostly flat (approx 10 metres (33 ft) above sea level) but in the south-west of the locality rises quickly to 100 metres (330 ft). There is a water tank at the high point of the suburb which offers views across Townsville. It is accessible by a firebreak track from Tank Hill, Diamantina Street (19.3315°S 146.8156°E).

== History ==
The name Wulguru comes from Wulgurukaba, the language/group name of the Aboriginal people of the Cleveland Bay area.

The Wulguru railway station (19.3260°S 146.8263°E) on the North Coast railway line has been abandoned.

Wulguru State School opened on 30 January 1962.

== Demographics ==
In the 2016 census, Wulguru had a population of 4,570 people.

In the 2021 census, Wulguru had a population of 4,389 people.

== Heritage listings ==
Wulguru has a number of heritage-listed sites, including:

- Off Stuart Drive (formerly in Stuart, 19.3349°S 146.8245°E): former Operations and Signals Bunker

== Education ==
Wulguru State School is a government primary (Prep–6) school for boys and girls at Edison Street (19.3245°S 146.8121°E). In 2018, the school had an enrolment of 302 students with 27 teachers (24 full-time equivalent) and 18 non-teaching staff (12 full-time equivalent). It includes a special education program.

There are no secondary schools in Wulguru. The nearest government secondary school is William Ross State High School in neighbouring Annandale to the north-west; it is adjacent to the Southern Cross Catholic College.

== Amenities ==
There are a number of parks in the area:

- Edison Street Park (19.3271°S 146.8098°E)
- Walguru Park (19.3238°S 146.8148°E)
- Warrego Street Park (19.3260°S 146.8243°E)
- Wulguru Park (19.3239°S 146.8163°E)

== World War 2 bunker ==
At the corner of Diamantina Street and Stuart Drive is a large block of land at the base of Mount Stuart. During World War II, this was the site of No. 3 Fighter Sector RAAF including the Operations and Signals Bunker. Three Fighter Sector headquarters comprised 32 rooms in the large rectangular concrete building with Caneite partitions forming various passageways. The building still stands today and is 60 by 42 feet (18 by 13 m). The mezzanine floor has long since disappeared.

The bunker structure is listed in the Queensland Heritage Register and encompasses the boundary of Diamantina Street, Stuart Drive and Hill Street.
