= William Ross State High School =

Location
- 66 Mervyn Crossman Drive, Annandale; Townsville, Queensland, 4814; Australia; 19°18′55″S 146°47′59″E

Information
- Type: State high school
- Motto: Success through commitment
- Established: 1991
- Principal: Peter Stumer
- Teaching staff: 82
- Grades: 7–12
- Enrolment: 975 (2023)
- Classrooms: 62
- Website: williamrossshs.eq.edu.au

William Ross State High School is an independent public high school situated in the Townsville Suburb of Annandale, North Queensland.

William Ross has a student count from grades 7 through to 12 of close to 905 (as of 2020) students which continues to rise annually, particularly considering the school's locality for defence families.

William Ross has a large catchment area servicing the suburbs of Annandale, Stuart, Wulguru, Cluden, Serene Valley, Alligator Creek, Cungulla, Oak Valley, Woodstock, Calcium, Idalia, Oonoonba, Fairfield Waters, Rosslea, Douglas, Aitkenvale and Mundingburra. The results of the 2019 school opinion survey showed that 98% of students agree that they are getting a good education at school with 99% of staff enjoying working at their school.

The school offers a variety of academic, art and sports programs, and offers a "leading learner" program for junior students (grade 7 to 10) . The leading learner program extends student learning in English, Mathematics, Science and Humanities in order to better prepare them for senior school. Students are required to sit an entrance exam during grade 6 in order to be considered for the Leading Learner classes. Student literacy levels have been improved through a program developed by William Ross State High School in conjunction with four primary schools within its catchment area. Through the integration of primary and secondary schools the Year 6 students are able to improve their literacy levels with 85% of students maintaining or increasing their results from year 6 to 7.

The award winning STEAM Lab program is offered to all students as a co-curricular opportunity. STEAM Lab offers a range of learning activities that have included: QLD Human Powered Vehicle super series and the 2019 Strand Ephemera. Other science-based projects include: addressing water conservation, renewable energy and sustainable food production through the use of aquaculture, aquaponics and permaculture in their aquatics facility. In addition Mathematics and Technology combine to offer students the opportunity to develop Drone pilot skills and programming with robotics and drones.

William Ross State High School continues to offer students the "RHINOS" Sports Excellence program for junior and senior students which caters to the following sports: basketball, cricket, hockey, netball, rugby union, soccer, and touch.

== Awards ==
National Excellence in Teaching Award to Shelley DeRuyter for The NEiTA Award for Innovation in Online Teaching and the Terry O’Connell Regional and Remote Teachers’ Award

Peter Doherty Award in the area of Outstanding School STEM for the state of Queensland in 2019.

Strand Ephemera "Future Astronomers Illuminated" art exhibition "The caliber of work presented at Strand Ephemera 2019 was at such high standard that the judges wished to name a Highly Commended, along with the major award winner"
