= St Patrick's Convent, North Ward =

Historic site in Queensland, Australia

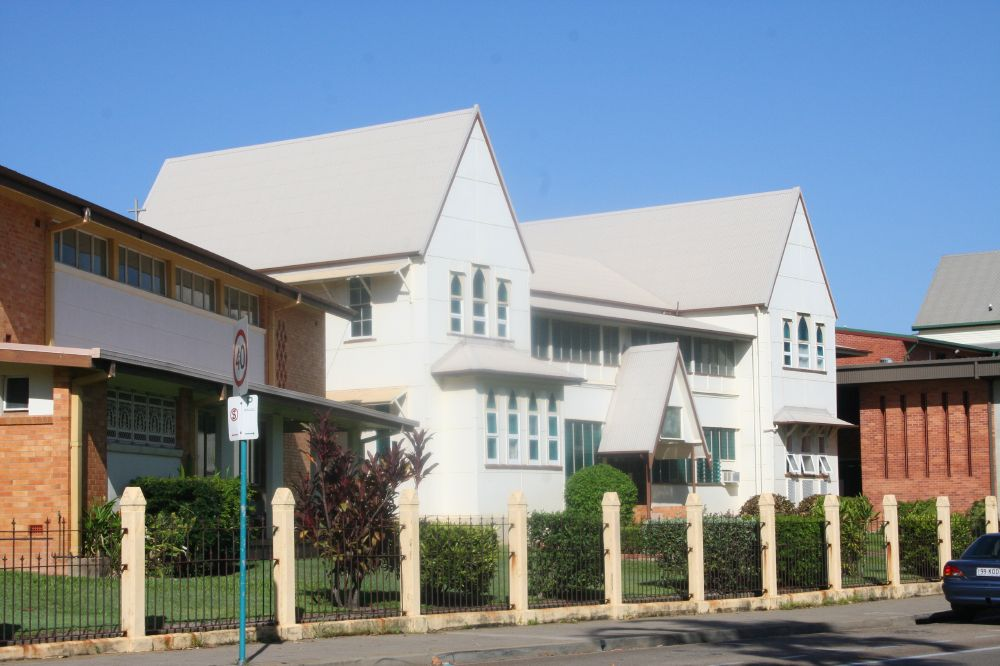
- St Patrick's Convent, 2012

- Location within Queensland
- Interactive map of St Patrick's Convent, North Ward

Monastery information
- Order: Sisters of Mercy
- Denomination: Roman Catholic
- Established: 21 January 1883
- Dedication: Saint Patrick
- Diocese: Townsville

People
- Founder: Dr John Cani

Architecture
- Status: Active
- Functional status: Convent
- Completion date: c. 1883

Site
- Location: 45 The Strand, North Ward, City of Townsville, Queensland
- Country: Australia
- Coordinates: 19°15′10″S 146°49′03″E

Designations

Queensland Heritage Register
- Official name: St Patrick's Convent
- Type: State heritage (built)
- Designated: 3 February 2012
- Reference no.: 602796

St Patrick's Convent is a heritage-listed Roman Catholic convent at 45 The Strand, North Ward, City of Townsville, Queensland, Australia. It was built in c. 1883. It was added to the Queensland Heritage Register on 3 February 2012.

== History ==
St Patrick's Convent, the oldest known surviving purpose-built convent in Queensland, is a timber-framed two-storey building located on The Strand at Townsville. It was built for the Sisters of Mercy during 1883 and was a substantial improvement on an earlier one built for the Sisters of St Joseph. They had worked in the parish since 1872, establishing a school and convent, before leaving Townsville early in 1878. The Sisters of Mercy arrived later that year. This representative convent building has been the base for the Sisters of Mercy mission in North Queensland for almost 130 years.

Townsville was established as a port to service the pastoral lands of inland North Queensland. Founded in 1864 by John Melton Black and Robert Towns, after whom the city is named, it boomed following the discovery of gold in the late 1860s and early 1870s at the five nearby towns of Capeville, Ravenswood, Georgetown, Gilberton and Charters Towers. By the 1890s Townsville was the main port in North Queensland, superseding Bowen which was founded as Port Denison in 1861. Townsville's location provided a sheltered port in Cleveland Bay and Ross Creek, with road access to the interior. This was complemented by the growth of railways to the west, the first stage of which was built to Charters Towers in 1882. Early industries included wool, cattle grazing and mining. Townsville was, and continues to be, the main commercial centre supporting the inland settlements and the growth of the sugar industry along the coast.

Catholicism in Queensland expanded following the separation of Queensland and the creation of the Diocese of Queensland. Newly appointed Bishop James Quinn arrived in Queensland, accompanied by five priests and five Sisters of Mercy, in May 1861. At the time the population of the Colony of Queensland was 30,059, with 7696 (39%) of these being Catholics. From 1866 both Anglican and Catholic visiting clergy held services in the courthouse in Townsville. In October 1868, Quinn acquired two adjoining parcels of land on the corner of Fryer Street and The Strand. Father James Connolly was sent to Townsville in 1871, and St Joseph's Church and presbytery were built shortly after. The Anglicans built St James' Church in 1873 and established a school in 1877, predated by the National School, established in 1869.

The Sisters of St Joseph, the order founded by Saint Mary MacKillop, arrived in Townsville in 1872, initially living in a couple of rooms at the rear of the presbytery. In 1873 a small low-set shingle-roofed timber convent was built behind the church, and a school was established. The sisters taught around 100 students at that time, and it was the first convent school in North Queensland. In 1876 tenders were called for the erection of a school house, and the following year, tenders were called for the removal and enlargement of the convent. In 1877 the convent was relocated on the site and enlarged to eight rooms to accommodate orphans and boarders. As a consequence of an argument between the sisters and the parish priest Father Connolly, the Sisters of St Joseph departed Townsville in March 1878, accompanied by 15 orphans, and then resided at the South Brisbane Convent. By October 1879, the Sisters of St Joseph relocated to their Adelaide motherhouse, having been driven out of Queensland by Bishop Quinn.

Father Connolly's successor in Townsville, Father William Mason Walsh, who was to serve the parish for almost 30 years, arrived in August 1878. He reportedly requested the services of the Sisters of Mercy to resume the operation of the school, although this is likely to have been initiated by Bishop Quinn. Walsh quickly organised a bazaar to fund a new convent. Prior to their arrival, Father Walsh had arranged for the existing convent house to be renovated and repainted and a shed was built to house the school and was being furnished.

The Sisters of Mercy arrived in November 1878. The order had been founded in Ireland by Catherine McAuley in 1831, with a mission to improve social justice through educational, religious and social services to women and children who were at risk of homelessness, exploitation and entrenched poverty. In essence their commitment was in the service of the poor, sick and uneducated. They were the preferred order of Bishop Quinn who when replacing the Sisters of St Joseph with the Sisters of Mercy in Mackay in 1879 stated: "I want first class education given in all leading places". After Father Walsh acquired allotment 3 on Mitchell Street, a boarding school known as St Patrick's, was re-established on this site during 1880. The non-vested primary school remained named St Joseph's, situated in Fryer Street.

Bishop Quinn died in September 1881, and Italian priest Dr John Cani became his temporary replacement. Robert Dunne was inducted into the role of Bishop of Queensland. However, in December Dr Cani was appointed to a new diocese of Rockhampton, created to service central and north Queensland. The Rockhampton Diocese was extensive, beginning just north of Bundaberg and reaching up to Halifax, west to the Northern Territory border, with its northern border just south of the Gulf of Carpentaria. Far North Queensland was served by the Pro-Vicarate of North Queensland, established in 1876, which encompassed the area north of Halifax and included Cape York. In 1881 the Sisters of Mercy in Townsville were teaching 130 girls, 87 boys and 188 infants. During the following decade, the Sisters of Mercy took over schools in Charters Towers (1882) and Bowen (1885).

In the meantime, a new dormitory was added to St Patrick's boarding facilities by local architects and builders, Rooney Brothers. It opened in October 1882 and provided room for a further 18 beds. The only other boarding school to have operated in Townsville prior to this was a small private establishment operated by Mrs Deakin O'Reilly in 1875. The longevity of this establishment is unknown. Three other short-lived schools operated in the late 1870s through to the mid 1880s. The last of these, Dr Thomatis's grammar school operated briefly between 1881 and 1886. Townsville Grammar, established in 1888 housed boarders, as did St Anne's Anglican girls' school, which started with six boarders in 1917 thereby making St Patrick's the oldest operational boarding school in Townsville.

Construction commenced on the new St Patrick's Convent after Father Walsh acquired another allotment on The Strand to the north of the church in 1882. The foundation stone for the convent was laid by Dr Cani on 21 January 1883. The ceremony included the admission of four novices into the convent and the initiation of the building fund. The exact date of the building's completion is unknown. Photographs of this building depict a two-storey timber colonial structure with verandahs to the front and sides and a small central gable. St Patrick's is the oldest extant purpose-built convent in Queensland.

Rapid expansion in the region led to a growth in ecclesiastical buildings to service the population. Between 1876 and 1891, Townsville was the fastest growing region of Queensland with the town's population more than doubling from 5,410 in 1881 to 11,454 within the five years to 1886. A second storey was added to St Patrick's boarding school in 1887. During 1888 another church, St Mary's was established at West Townsville, as well as a school managed by the Sisters of Mercy, who travelled every day from The Strand.

The expansion of buildings in Fryer Street and on The Strand was not without setbacks. St Joseph's Church was dislodged from its foundations during major flooding in January 1892 and had to be demolished. Water also entered the convent grounds to a depth of six feet, partially undermining one corner of the building, as well as washing away some stumps of the home of architect Matthew Rooney in Fryer Street. The recently erected church belfry was left standing but listing at a 45 degree angle. The flood resulted from a two-day rainfall of over 32 inches (81 cm). After the flood, Mass was held in the school for many years. Fr Walsh resolved to build a church on higher ground and began planning for a large new church situated in Stanley Street, at the foot of Castle Hill. A design competition was held in 1894 and the resultant Church of the Sacred Heart, which opened in 1902, became known as the Townsville Cathedral. At the time there was a perception that Townsville was soon to become the seat of a new diocese of North Queensland, excised from the northern part of the Rockhampton diocese. Despite the fact that there were 3000 Catholics in Townsville at the turn of the century, the new diocese was not created until 1930.

The Sisters of Mercy initiated what is now the oldest operational high school for girls in Townsville. Early in 1892, they advertised the commencement of a University Class at St Patrick's Convent on The Strand. At the end of the year, it was reported that four students had passed their junior examinations. By 1900 junior and senior examinations were offered, as well as teacher registration examinations at St Patrick's. These exams were set by Sydney University until 1910 when Queensland University began setting its own papers based on the Sydney model. At this time in Queensland, only private high schools such as Townsville Grammar existed. Established in 1888, it accepted its first female student in 1893 and became co-educational in 1905. Grammar Schools provided the only government-subsidised secondary education available in Queensland prior to 1912 when state high schools were established. While the Thomatis's Grammar School did offer high school places for girls, it was a short-lived operation (1881–1886). St Patrick's preceded Townsville Grammar by one year in providing high school education for girls.

In response to continued growth in the region St Patrick's Convent was dramatically extended and renovated in 1900 by local contractor Mr William Dawson. The original gable roofed 1883 core of the building had verandahs to the front and sides on both levels. Wings were added to the north and south ends of the structure altering the building's appearance from The Strand. It was then dominated by the two prominent steeply pitched gable roofs sheltering the end wings and a tall pyramidal roof marking the central entry porch. The alterations included decorative treatments of the carpenter Gothic style to the front elevation and verandahs, including quatrefoil windows to the gable infills and to a decorative panel to the tower, pointed arch windows with hood moulds, pointed arch valances and decorative screens.

A newspaper article published in the North Queensland Herald in November 1900 described the newly renovated building: The ground floor of the south wing comprised a chapel for the Sisters of Mercy, being 40 by 16 ft (12.2 by 4.9 m), which boasted a highly ornamental ceiling, paintings on the walls and an ornate altar. The chapel opened onto both front and rear verandahs of the building, and also led to the high school room in the north wing. Its size replicated that of the chapel with 14 ft (4.3 m) wall plates and included similar decorative features. The rear verandah was 90 ft (27 m) long and 9 ft (2.7 m) wide and was enclosed with lattice. The first floor housed a community room above the chapel with views across the harbour. The 80 ft (24 m) corridor had bedrooms on either side. The upper floor on the northern wing contained five rooms. The front balcony was 130 and 9 ft (39.6 and 2.7 m) wide. No architect has been identified, although it is possibly the work of the Rooney Brothers, who had undertaken previous work for the Sisters of Mercy; or possibly the work of WG Smith and Sons who designed St Mary's convent in Charters Towers for the Sisters of Mercy in 1891–92 and are known to have been Catholics, with WG Smith's daughter' wedding ceremony held at St Patrick's convent in 1898.

In late nineteenth century convent design, the convention was to distinguish between public and private uses and spheres within the building. The plans for St Patrick's demonstrate this: the room to the north of the entry hall was the visitor parlour; the room to the south was the priest's vestry; the room to the west of the visitor parlour was the priest's breakfast room; and the internal stairwell rising to the bedrooms above is screened from the entrance hall. These planning arrangements demonstrate the law of enclosure regulating life within the convent. Public access to the chapel was generally limited to the celebrations involving the induction of novices. Some convents also provided boarding facilities, but St Patrick's already had separate boarding accommodation, so boarders were not accommodated in the convent.

Townsville's location in the tropical north meant it was regularly impacted by significant weather events. Cyclone Leonta struck on 9 March 1903, and the deaths of seven patients in the wrecked hospital may be attributed to it. The brick Grammar School was partially demolished. The roof was torn from the Sacred Heart Cathedral. There was little impact to St Patrick's Convent although the school buildings sustained some damage.

A number of administrative changes occurred to the Sisters of Mercy around the turn of the century, with ongoing building projects occurring into the early twentieth century. Bishop Cani died in March 1898 and was replaced by Bishop Joseph Higgins. He invited the Josephite nuns to return to Queensland and they opened a school in Clermont in 1900. In 1901 the Sisters of Mercy severed their links with the Rockhampton Community, of which they had been part since 1873.

A new era began for the Sisters of Mercy in North Queensland, continuing throughout the twentieth century. Many new convent and church buildings were constructed as part of the ongoing development of the region. Mary Benigna Desmond became the Mother Superior of the Townsville community from 1901, making St Patrick's the Motherhouse. At the time the sisters had branches in Bowen, Ravenswood, and Winton, with 36 nuns teaching 800 children. An important component of the growth of the order in North Queensland was the establishment of a Novitiate, or training house, in 1901 in the grounds of St Patrick's. The Sisters of Mercy opened another school in South Townsville in 1904. December 1905 Bishop Higgins was transferred to Ballarat and James Duhig was consecrated as Bishop of Rockhampton. Duhig dedicated St Patrick's High School adjacent to the convent on The Strand in Townsville costing £3100 in October 1911, reputedly designed by Mother Bernadine. On the same day he dedicated a new altar to Father Walsh, who died in 1908, at the Sacred Heart Church. In 1917, the Sisters of Mercy opened a new convent at St Mary's at West Townsville, in a house relocated to the site for the purpose. A new St Joseph's Church was built in Fryer Street in 1921. A hostel known as St Rita's was opened in an old house relocated to The Strand to the north of the convent, reputedly in the early 1900s. It provided accommodation for young women from country areas working in Townsville.

The interwar years saw ongoing expansion of the church's activities in North Queensland. A submission was made to Rome in 1927 to create the new diocese of Townsville. At the time there were 22,000 Catholics in the proposed diocese, 6000 of them being in Townsville. Catholics in this region comprised 24 per cent of the population, compared with 18.9 per cent as the national average. The diocese was created on 25 May 1930 under Bishop Terence McGuire. This event had been preceded by the celebrations of the golden jubilee of the Sisters of Mercy in August 1929, attended by 60 sisters. At that time they were educating around 2000 children in the North Queensland towns of Bowen, Ravenswood, West End (Townsville), South Townsville, Ingham, Proserpine, Halifax and Home Hill.

The existence of the Novitiate was integral to this growth with 50 Australian-born women entering St Patrick's Convent from 1901 until 1990 and the motherhouse continuing to receive sisters from Ireland. In 1926 there was a massive intake of 35 Irish sisters. The chapel was the site of ritual celebration and ceremony for the induction of postulants, and newspaper articles described the events in great detail including the attire of the newly blessed novices and the chapel's floral arrangements and the attendance of their friends and relatives.

Further expansion of educational facilities occurred during the 1930s. A new catholic school was built at Garbutt's Siding in June 1933. Rosario Infants School opened on The Strand in 1935, pioneering the Montessori Method of infant teaching in North Queensland. In 1936 the Little Flower Academy, a concrete and timber building, opened on the site of the old St Rita's hostel, the operations of which were relocated to the presbytery. The Bishop vacated the old presbytery and moved to Stanley Street near the Cathedral. The Little Flower Academy was a commercial and domestic science building designed by Joseph Gabriel Rooney and built by Willam George Hammond. According to Bishop Maguire, these subjects would equip a young lady with the education she needed to exert and influence good in the world. St Patrick's Convent remained the home from which the Sisters of Mercy went out to conduct the core activities of their mission. Other convents were added to Townsville during 1936, including those for the Sisters of St Joseph, the Sisters of the Good Samaritan and a Sisters of Mercy convent at Railway Estate. Bishop McGuire also found ways of financing holidays for the sisters to Bowen or a similar seaside retreat, and St Patrick's in more recent years has served that purpose for sisters from throughout the diocese.

During World War II many buildings on The Strand were used by the military including St Patrick's Convent, St Rita's, the school and the Little Flower Academy-all occupied by the Women's Auxiliary Australian Air Force (WAAAF). The sisters were vacated to other convents, day students were taught at West End and the boarding students were relocated to Ravenswood and Winton. The WAAAF vacated the buildings in June 1945. In July, the church advertised in the local press that the buildings were undergoing painting, repairs and renovations and were expected to be ready for occupation in September. The exact nature of the renovations is unknown. The fibro cladding on the exterior of the building was installed between the late 1950s and 1964, and included the enclosure of the front verandahs, reusing existing sash windows on the upper floor and installing louvres on the lower floor. The central spire was removed and replaced with a gabled entry porch at the ground level.

A new bishop, Dr Hugh Edward Ryan, was appointed to Townsville in 1938. Shortly before the end of the war, he was able to fulfil the dream of his predecessor Bishop McGuire, in establishing a Catholic hospital in Townsville. In February 1945 local doctor, Dr Halberstater handed over his small private hospital, "Lister", to the Sisters of Mercy. The establishment of the Mater Misericordiae Hospital fulfilled another aspect of the mission of the Sisters of Mercy: serving the sick. In April 1954, fundraising began for a new Mater Hospital. The 50 bed hospital was opened in Fulham Road, Pimlico in 1962. Another wing was added in 1967, and further extensions in 1979 and 1983. In the meantime the sisters also ventured into aged care with the establishment of Villa Vincent in the suburb of Gulliver in 1964. Villa McAuley retirement accommodation was established nearby in 1979 and was extended in 1980 and 1982. Bishop Ryan retired in 1967 having overseen dramatic changes in the Townsville Diocese since 1938, including a doubling of the population of Catholics, which was reflected in the number of priests, brothers (from 15 to 38) and nuns (from 143 to 211) in the community.

The most dramatic changes to the Sisters of Mercy site on The Strand occurred during the late twentieth century. New buildings were added including a chapel on the site of St Rita's (the old presbytery) in 1959, a new science block and classrooms in 1963; another new building for St Patrick's high school and the Loreto Infirmary in 1968 which provided aged care for nuns. In December 1971, Cyclone Althea damaged St Patrick's Convent, tearing off part of the roof of the north and south gables causing internal water damage. Some cladding was broken on the front enclosed verandah on the first floor. The sash windows were replaced with louvres sometime after the cyclone. In 1978 Australian Government funding allowed for the upgrade of boarder's facilities and another science block. The 1911 high school building adjacent to the convent was demolished and replaced with a brick dormitory building of a similar style in the mid 1980s. The Little Flower Academy developed "concrete cancer" and was replaced by a new administrative building which opened in 1991, retaining the name St Theresa's.

St Patrick's College on The Strand in Townsville operates as the Mercy Catholic Secondary Day and Residential College, adjacent to St Joseph's Church and primary school. A dramatic fall in the number of religious staff generally in Catholic schools occurred during the late twentieth century, with numbers of brothers and nuns in the Townsville diocese dropping from 99 to 50 between 1967 and 1971, and down to 31 religious teachers in 1983. In September 2008, St Joseph's Church hosted the Jubilee celebrations of ten sisters serving the diocese. Eight had served for 50 years, one 60 years, and Sister Mary Pius Carrol, 70 years. In 2011 the convent housed the last remaining sisters, having also served as a place of retreat and relaxation for nuns of the Townsville Diocese for many years.

A decorative fence with concrete pillars and metal palisade panels is located on the boundary with The Strand and along Fryer Street to St Joseph's Church. It may have been built at the same time as the church in 1921. Photographic evidence indicates it pre-dates 1933. Two gates are retained in Fryer Street which would have provided access to the old presbytery; one a pedestrian gate and a vehicle access gate. Three more pedestrian gates are situated along The Strand accessing the convent and the other buildings to the north.

== Description ==
St Patrick's Convent, a two-storey timber framed building, stands within the St Patrick's College complex bounded by The Strand and Fryer and Oxley Streets, Townsville. Facing The Strand, the building is notable for its steeply pitched gable roofs to the north and south wings.

The building is symmetrical around a central core flanked by projecting wings to the north and south. Verandahs are provided to the north, east and west; the north and east now enclosed with louvres and asbestos cement sheeting. The west and part of the north verandahs retain decorative balustrading, lattice and valance. The exterior of the north and south wings have asbestos cement sheeting applied over chamferboard and weatherboard cladding. Generally the building is constructed of single skin walls; the mid-west wall is clad with chamferboards and lined with beaded vertical boards; some internal partitions are lined to each side.

The main entry is from the east verandah through a timber panelled door with coloured glass sidelights. The ground floor is organised off a central entrance hall, flanked by the visitor parlour to the north and vestry to the south. The entrance hall is screened from the central stairwell by a three-quarter height partition accommodating a door with brightly coloured glass panels. Two rooms flanking the stairwell mirror the east rooms and open into them. The room to the south accommodates the office and the priest breakfast room is to the north. A community dining room runs the length of the north wing and a former chapel occupies the south wing. Two decorative timber arches span the community room at the west end. The chapel ceiling is lined with decorative pressed metal and a decorative timber arch defines an alcove to the east. Ground floor partitions and other ceilings are lined with beaded tongue and groove boards. The ground floor west verandah retains its decorative screening, valance, lattice and criss-cross balustrading. The ground floor east and north verandah are enclosed with asbestos sheeting and banks of louvres and each has added partitioning.

The upper floor works off a central corridor running north-south accommodating eight bedrooms to the west and six to the east. Timber arches mark the transition between the earlier central core and the wings. One west bedroom is partitioned into two bathrooms; one houses a lift and another has a partition removed and functions as a small sitting room. To accommodate built-in wardrobes in the east bedrooms one partition has been removed. The upper east rooms to the north and south wings have added partitioning providing additional bedrooms. Corridor partitions are post-and-rail lined with vertical boards to the corridor, the east wall single skin exposed frame is lined with horizontal boards to the rooms and the west wall is a combination of exposed frame single skin to the wings and chamferboard cladding to the 1883 core. Openings in the rooms at the north and south end of the 1883 core are boarded. The upper north verandah is enclosed with asbestos sheeting and louvres and accommodates bathrooms and an informal kitchen. The middle part of the west verandah is enclosed to provide a utilities room.

Lawns with garden beds run from the front of the convent to the street. A perimeter fence comprising concrete piers and decorative wrought iron balustrading runs along The Strand and Fryer Street. Decorative wrought iron gates provide entrances from The Strand and Fryer Street. A concrete path runs from the pedestrian gate on The Strand to the front entrance.

== Heritage listing ==
St Patrick's Convent was listed on the Queensland Heritage Register on 3 February 2012 having satisfied the following criteria.

The place is important in demonstrating the evolution or pattern of Queensland's history.

St Patrick's Convent is the oldest known surviving purpose-built convent in Queensland. The convent, home to Townsville's Sisters of Mercy since 1883, is important in demonstrating the way of life of a religious order that has made a significant contribution to the development of Queensland, particularly in relation to the provision of education and health care. It also serves as a place of retreat for sisters ministering elsewhere in the diocese.

St Patrick's Convent is a product of the establishment phase of Catholic primary and secondary education in North Queensland when its institutions spread out from Brisbane to newly emerging settlements around the colony. From 1892 the convent accommodated classes for St Patrick's high school, now the oldest operational high school for girls in Townsville.

St Patrick's Convent illustrates the pattern of development of Townsville, the major commercial centre of North Queensland. The region's wealth, initially generated through mining, pastoral and agricultural pursuits, led to the establishment of the port of Townsville and numerous schools, to serve the population. The ongoing development of the school site is evidence of the growth and prosperity of the city.

The place is important in demonstrating the principal characteristics of a particular class of cultural places.

St Patrick's Convent demonstrates the principal characteristics of a convent, built in the late nineteenth and early twentieth centuries including an internal separation of private and public spaces and having a dominant street presence on a prominent site in the town. The convent plan includes a chapel, community room, dining room, visitor parlour, priest breakfast room, vestry and bedroom cells. The small and austere bedroom cells on the upper floor are representative of the vow of poverty taken by the sisters, as are the modest and functional spaces and restrained use of decorative treatments throughout the convent, reflecting the philosophy of the Sisters of Mercy in their mission to serve the poor, the sick and the uneducated.

The place has a special association with the life or work of a particular person, group or organisation of importance in Queensland's history.

The building has had a special association with the Sisters of Mercy since its construction in 1883, and was the Motherhouse for the order in the Townsville region from 1901. The Sisters of Mercy have provided education in the region since 1878, building many schools across the Townsville diocese including establishing the oldest operational high school for girls in St Patrick's. The chapel in the southern wing regularly received novices into the order, and the ritual celebrations at these events attended by the sisters' friends and families served to publicly acknowledge and promote the role of the Sisters of Mercy in Queensland in the upkeep of Catholic traditions. The sisters established the Mater Hospital in Townsville, as well as aged care facilities, to fulfil their mission of providing for the poor, the sick and the uneducated. The convent occupies a prominent position within the campus of St Patrick's College, Townsville, demonstrating the ongoing commitment of the Sisters of Mercy to their mission in Queensland.
