= John Fanning =

John Fanning may refer to:

- John Fanning (footballer) (born 1948), Australian rules footballer for Essendon
- John Fanning (writer) (born 1973), Irish writer
- John Fanning (Irish politician) (1903–1982), Irish Fianna Fáil politician from Tipperary
- John Fanning (Upper Canada politician) (died 1813), innkeeper, stagecoach operator and politician in Upper Canada
- John H. Fanning (1916–1990), American lawyer and member of the National Labor Relations Board
- John Pat Fanning, member of the West Virginia Senate
- John T. Fanning (1837–1911), American architect
- John Joseph Fanning, Irish-Australian insurance manager, equestrian judge and civic leader
