= Townsville West State School =

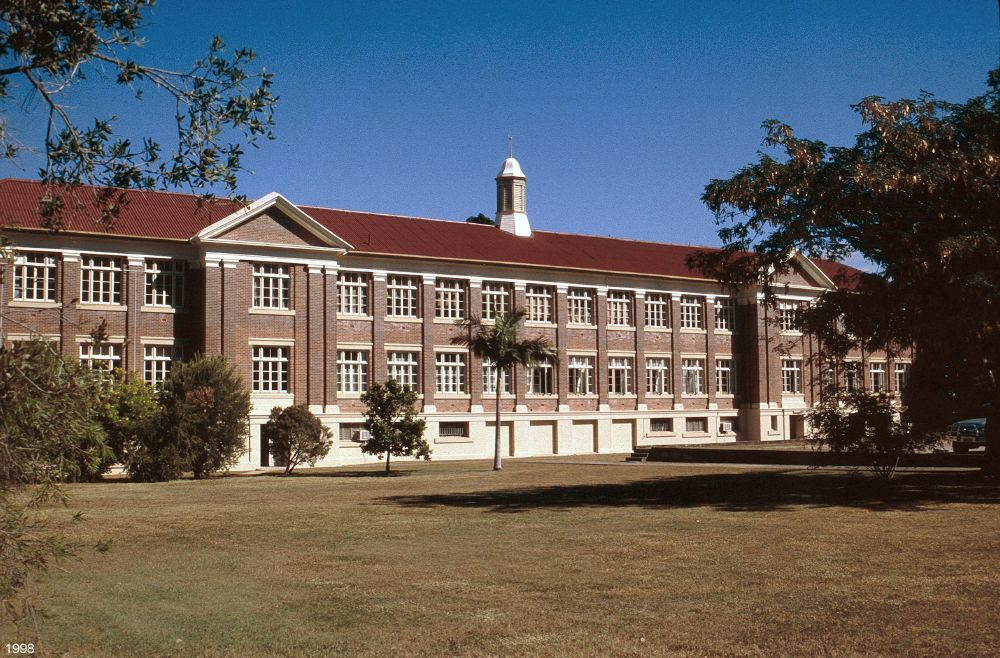
- Townsville West State School, 1998

- Location within Queensland Location within Australia
- 19.2681°S 146.8038°E
- Location: 29 Ingham Road, West End, City of Townsville, Queensland, Australia

History
- Design period: 1870s–1890s (late 19th century)
- Built: 1921–1939

Queensland Heritage Register
- Official name: Townsville and District Education Centre and Memorial Gates, Townsville West State School
- Type: state heritage (built)
- Designated: 5 October 1998
- Reference no.: 602049
- Significant period: 1920s–1930s (historical); 1940s (historical); 1920s (fabric gates); 1930s–1940s (fabric school)
- Significant components: roof/ridge ventilator/s / fleche/s, bell – school, memorial – gate/s, school/school room

Townsville West State School is a heritage-listed former state school at 29 Ingham Road, West End, City of Townsville, Queensland, Australia. It was built from 1921 to 1939. It is also known as Townsville and District Education Centre and Memorial Gates. It was added to the Queensland Heritage Register on 5 October 1998.

== History ==
The former Townsville West State School, designed by the Queensland Government Architects Office was opened on 10 June 1939. Costing £28,200, the school was built during the Depression by local workers employed under the Unemployment Relief Scheme. The school building of 1937–1939 is the second of three Townsville West State Schools constructed within the same school grounds. The first, constructed in 1886–1887, was one of the earliest public schools of Townsville.

Early settlement in Townsville spread along the beach in the present North Ward area, with the commercial centre located along the bank of Ross Creek in the present Flinders Street East area. As the town developed settlement spread south-west along the track to the hinterland which was an extension of Flinders Street. By 1868 the West End Cemetery had been established along the track in the area known as West End. By 1878 the Carrier Arms Hotel, a soap and candle factory in Morris St, the Townsville Gas and Coke Co and the Townsville Brewery Co had sprung up in the new suburb. The North Queensland Pastoral and Agricultural Association was formed on 19 December 1879 and the stockyards and ring were constructed soon after in their present location on Ingham Road.

West End, along with neighbouring suburbs, saw a second wave of population growth after the completion of railway facilities in the North Yards in the early 1880s. Along Ingham Road the West End Hotel (1885) and St Mary's Catholic Church (1888) both survive from this period.

The rising population triggered the need for a school in West End. On 22 April 1884 the Mayor, Henry Barbenson le Touzel Hubert, made an application for a school reserve to be set aside in the West End area. A reserve of four acres was established with some of the land being excised from the nearby cemetery reserve (West End Cemetery). Because of the growth of the suburb it was estimated that the school would need to accommodate 400 students.

By 11 January 1886 tenders had been called for the construction of a timber school building, out-buildings and a head teacher's residence. Townsville West State School was built with government funding and a one-fifth subscription from the local community as required under the State Education Act of 1875. The school was opened on 21 March 1887.

By 1919 Townsville West was the third largest school in Queensland with an enrolment of 1150 students and a staff of thirty-three.

Gladys Moncrieff, one of Australia's most famous singers, attended the school during the first years of the twentieth century. The school has a perpetual trophy in her name for singing at the Townsville Juvenile Eisteddfod.

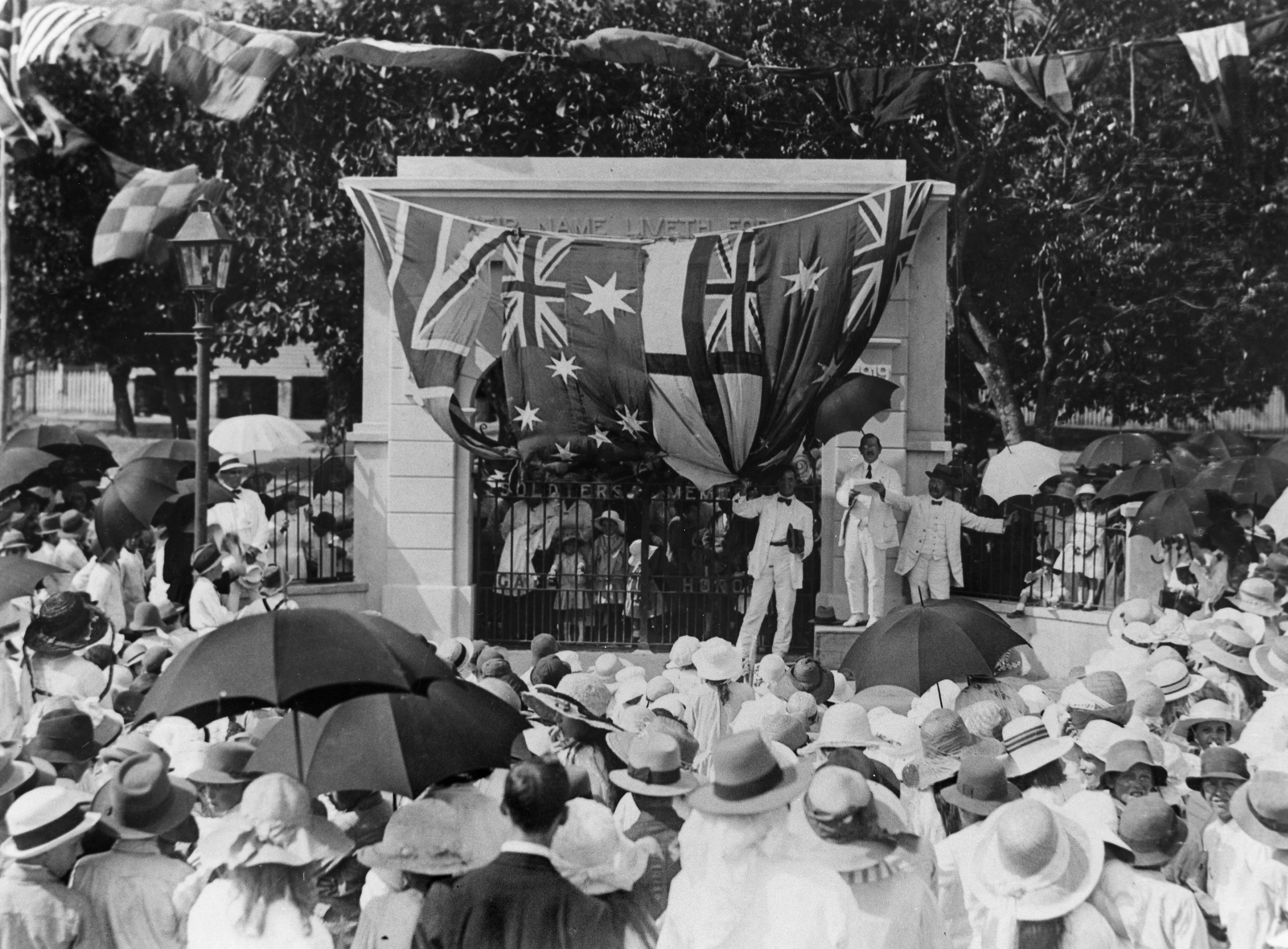
Opening of the memorial gates, 1921

The school has also honoured students and teachers who served, and in some cases died, during WWI, by erecting both honour boards in the entrance foyer, and memorial gates. Because both memorials contain the same number of names it is thought that the honour boards were installed soon after the war. However, in 1921 the school community apparently decided to remember their past students in a more tangible way by erecting War Memorial Gates at the entrance to the school. A fete was held and £542 was raised, of which £430 was used to construct the gates which stand at the main school entrance on Ingham Rd. 200 names inscribed on marble tablets are attached to the arched gateway. This memorial was dedicated on Friday 9 December 1921. Close to Anzac Day each year the school still holds a ceremony to honour past students who have served in the armed services in both world wars and other military conflicts.

By the 1930s the area had grown to the extent that the original school building was seen as inadequate. The old building was thought to be poorly ventilated and lacking light, so it was decided to construct the present building. Some of the old school buildings were pulled down and the timber was used to construct hospitals on Palm and Fantome Islands. The head teacher's House was sold and re-located at 17 Truscott Street, Garbutt and the kindergarten building was given to the Townsville Grammar School.

On 18 September 1937, the Jubilee Year of Townsville West State School, the foundation stone of the new school was laid by the Hon Maurice Hynes, MLA, Secretary for Labour and Industry. Plans were prepared in the Queensland Government Architect's Office of the Department of Public Works. The new building, which cost £28,200, was opened by the Hon Harry Bruce, MLA, Minister for Public Works and Public Instruction, on 10 June 1939. The Chief Architect at the time was Andrew Baxter Leven (1885–1966). Leven was born, educated and worked as an Inspector of Works in Scotland before migrating to Australia. From 1910 to 1951 he was employed by the Queensland Government Works Department and was Chief Architect and Quantity Surveyor from 1933 to 1951. Other members of the office involved in design were Frederick Thomas Jellett and Harold James Parr.

Thirty brick schools of similar design to Townsville West were constructed in Queensland during the Depression. They were built as part of a Queensland Government initiative to provide impetus to the flagging economy through an active capital works program.

The school was constructed of brick and concrete. The whole of the ground floor, all corridors, hat and cloak rooms, and staircases were built in concrete, all other floors were made of hardwood. The building contained twenty-one classrooms situated on the first and second floors. 832 students could be accommodated in the new classrooms. There was also a woodwork room and a dressmaking classroom on the first floor, accommodating twenty students each. A head teacher's room, two staff teacher's rooms and hat and cloak rooms were also provided. Some of the classrooms on each of the first and second floors had folding partitions. Storerooms and toilets for male and female teachers, boys and girls and infants were located on the ground floor. The remainder of the ground floor space was utilised as play space. A complete drainage system was installed and the school grounds were graded and leveled.

First floor facilities in the new school building allowed for the commencement of domestic science and manual training. It was the only school in Townsville with such facilities and students from other areas visited the school once a week to receive tuition. At the beginning of 1942 Townsville became a restricted military zone with up to 90,000 military personnel stationed in the city and surrounding district. Townsville West State School, like many other schools, was commandeered by the military and a first aid post and convalescence ward were established on the first floor. Classes for Volunteer Aid Detachments (VADs) were held, dressmaking classes for the Women's Auxiliary Australian Air Force (WAAAF), first aid classes, various classes for the Royal Australian Air Force (RAAF) as well as community meetings. In September 1942, the 5th Australian Transport Unit under the command of Major Douglas, camped in the grounds under the fig trees at the rear of the school. These units used the school water supply and shared the ablutions with hospital patients.

During 1943 the medical facilities were moved out of the school. Some school classes reopened from 3 August and all classes were operating again by October 1943. However, the site was not completely vacated by the Australian Army until 31 March 1946.

Student enrolments peaked at about 1000 after the war and then began to decline. The decline was exacerbated by an Education Department policy decision to move Grade Eight from primary to secondary school in 1963. To boost numbers the school began accepted both physically and intellectual disabled students after 1957. The school was seen as specially suited to the needs of these students because of the domestic science and manual arts facilities. However, the location of these facilities on the first floor and the toilets on the ground floor created difficulties for disabled students. Eventual, all students and most school activities were moved to new school buildings on Wilson Street, behind the 1939 building.

When the Townsville Teachers College opened in 1969, West End State School was utilised as a Demonstration School for student teachers.

The building withstood the devastation of Cyclone Althea which hit Townsville on 24 December 1971. In the aftermath of the cyclone the Home Science room was opened to the community so that people could cook their meals. The Salvation Army also used the school as a relief centre, where they made bread, milk and blocks of ice available for several weeks after the cyclone.

In 1975 the Townsville and District Education Centre (TADEC) was established in one room of the school and by 1981 had expanded into half the building. TADEC, which is still operating from the building, is one of seven such centres in Queensland. It was established as a community education resource for teachers, parents and community groups and for the past twenty-three years has made a significant contribution to community education in North Queensland.

In 1977 an environmental study area was established in the school grounds at the initiative of students and teachers. The area received many honours including a Greening of Australia Project award in 1987. The school grounds also contain a number of trees including large banyans, figs and blackbeans, some of which bear small plaques. The fig trees have been in the grounds since before the 1920s and mark the site of WWII military camp. Two large trees situated on either side of the Memorial Gates may be related to the First Arbour Day.

The first floor corridor contains several photographs, including a depiction of the memorial gates, a gathering of past students for the 50 year Jubilee in 1937, and an award winning choral group.

The original school bell, which is over one hundred years old, hangs in its original position above the main entrance gates.

From 1991 to 2009, the building was used by the Townsville and District Education Centre, a library, conference rooms, a creche and kindergarten, manual arts and home science facilities and is a venue for a community playgroup.

== Description ==
The former Townsville West State School is a rectangular brick building of three stories, located at the intersection of Ingham Road and Sturt Street, Townsville, about two kilometres from the city centre. The building faces south addressing Ingham Road which becomes the highway north of the city. Opposite the building running parallel to the road is the northern railway line.

Set into a recess in the Ingham Road fence are the Memorial Gates. The gateway is a free-standing rendered masonry archway with a pair of wrought iron gates below. The archway has an elliptical arch with scored voussoirs, a coved cornice and scored pilasters to either side. "Their name liveth for ever" stands in relief on the cornice, with the dates "1914" and "1919" on each pilaster. The ironwork of the gates includes the words "Soldiers Memorial Gate of Honour". Mounted within the returns of the archway are two white marble tablets entitled "Honour Roll, Townsville West State School". Each tablet is inscribed with about 100 names, some marked with the letters "D", "K", "P" and "W". Behind the gateway on either side are a pair of large trees, possibly blackbeans.

The former Townsville West State School is a symmetrical building, with a linear plan on an east–west axis. At the centre of the southern facade is the projecting bay of the main entry and near either end are two smaller breakfronts with secondary entries. The roof is hipped and clad in painted corrugated fibrous cement sheet, with a timber fleche at its centre. The rear or northern elevation also has two breakfronts near either end which mark the linear plan, three-storey height, and Georgian-style symmetry, proportion and massing make the building prominent within its largely domestic context.

The external walls of the two upper levels of the building are face brick, punctuated by pilasters with rendered capitals and bases and a rendered cornice. Between the pilasters are paned casement windows with awning lights above. The two upper levels sit on the rendered base of the ground floor, which has arcades and smaller window openings.

The central bay of the southern facade is emphasised as the main entry to the building by the triangular pedimented gable, the rendered entry door surround, the double stairway and projecting further than the end bays. Also mounted over the main entry door is the school bell.

In the entry foyer on the first floor are brass plaques commemorating the opening of the building in 1939 and the centenary of the school in 1987. In the corridor near the entry hang two large timber honour boards entitled "Roll of Honour, Teachers and Pupils who fought for the Empire in the Great War". Each board has some 100 names, some marked with "K" and "W". Also in this corridor hang several historical photographs relating to the school, including a gathering of past students for the 50-year Jubilee of the school in 1937.

The first and second floors contain a series of classrooms opening onto a corridor running the length of the building on the southern side. There are panelled doors with toplights and double-hung windows between the classrooms and the corridor. The high ceilings, regular external windows and internal windows and doors provide substantial natural light and cross ventilation. The floors to the classrooms are timber, whilst the floors to the corridors, stairs and utilities are concrete. The two stairways, near either end of the building, have steel balustrades, cast newels and timber handrails.

Many of the classrooms of the two upper levels are divided by panelled folding timber partitions. The four classrooms at the centre of the first-floor level may all be opened to form a small auditorium with a stage at its eastern end. At the far eastern end of that level is the home science room. The ground-floor level includes covered play areas, ablutions, storage areas and a workshop.

The foreground of the former Townsville West State School building is lawn, pathways and carpark, with vehicular access from Wilson Street to the east. To the west of the building fronting Ingham Road is a small vegetated lot which includes a number of native plants. The building is separated from the present school to the north by a level grassed area which has low retaining walls and remnants of the tennis courts. The present school is a number of timber and transportable buildings beneath several large banyan trees, sited near the base of Castle Hill. To the west of the school playground is the West End Cemetery.

== Heritage listing ==
Townsville West State School was listed on the Queensland Heritage Register on 5 October 1998, having satisfied the following criteria.

The place is important in demonstrating the evolution or pattern of Queensland's history.

Opened in 1939, the former Townsville West State School, is demonstrative of a government scheme, the Unemployment Relief Scheme, implemented to assist the unemployed throughout Queensland, by means of generating work projects, during the Depression of the 1930s. The school, constructed during an era of substantial building activity, is one of four surviving, intact schools of the period in North Queensland, including Ayr State High School.

The former Townsville West State School Memorial Gates, constructed in 1921, are an example of a relatively small number of this type of memorial. War Memorials are important in demonstrating the pattern of Queensland's history as they are representative of a recurrent theme that involved most communities throughout the state. They provide evidence of an era of widespread Australian patriotism and nationalism, particularly during and following the First World War. Two timber honour boards located in the a corridor of the building also list names of former students and teachers who served in WWI.

The place demonstrates rare, uncommon or endangered aspects of Queensland's cultural heritage.

The former Townsville West State School Memorial Gates, constructed in 1921, are an example of a relatively small number of this type of memorial.

The place is important in demonstrating the principal characteristics of a particular class of cultural places.

The building is a fine example of a two-storeyed Inter-war brick school.

The place is important because of its aesthetic significance.

Due to its massing and scale, the building is a landmark in the suburban streetscape, in keeping with the Queensland Government's 1930s policy to raise the educational status of primary education through the construction of well designed, imposing buildings.

The place has a strong or special association with a particular community or cultural group for social, cultural or spiritual reasons.

The building has a strong association with the local community. The grounds on which the former Townsville West State School is built has been the site for over a century of public education for the West End and Townsville community. The building has also been the centre of a variety of community activity in the past, including the use, during WWII, of the building and grounds for a military encampment and convalescent ward and for community meetings and classes. During the emergency period following Cyclone Althea in 1971, the building was utilised as a community relief centre.
