= Wolverton, West End =

Wolverton
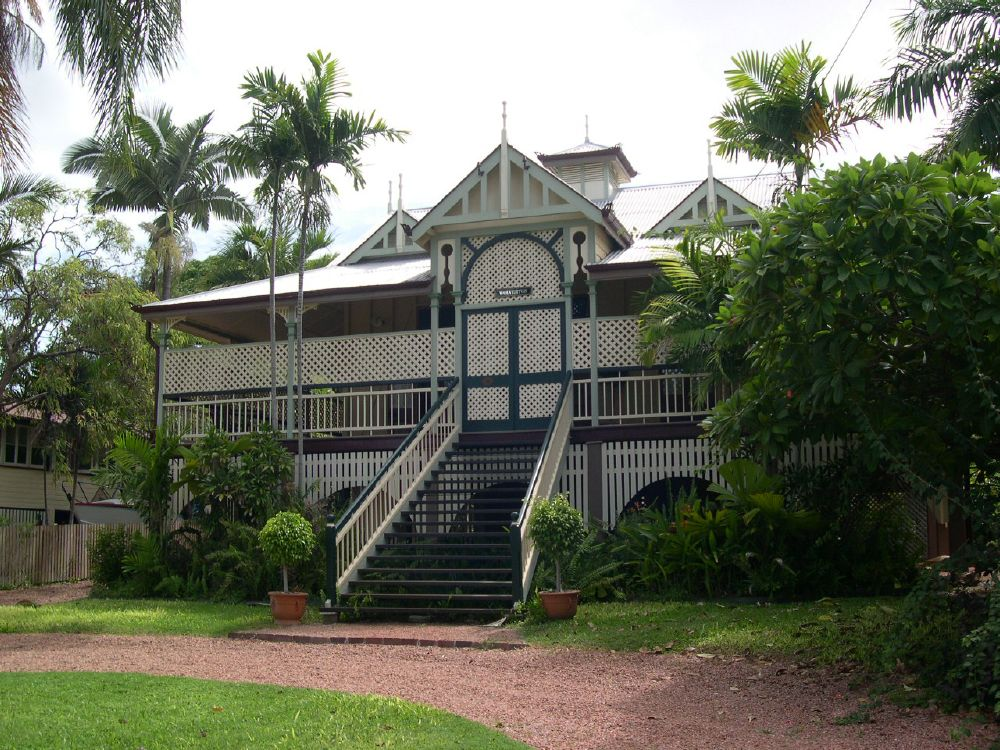
- Wolverton, 2005

- Location within Queensland Location within Australia
- 19.2569°S 146.7891°E
- Location: 95 Stagpole Street, West End, City of Townsville, Queensland, Australia

History
- Design period: 1900–1914 (early 20th century)
- Built: c. 1903
- Built for: Thomas Turton

Site notes
- Architectural styles: Federation Filigree, Queenslander

Queensland Heritage Register
- Official name: Wolverton
- Type: state heritage (landscape, built)
- Designated: 21 October 1992
- Reference no.: 600927
- Significant period: 1900s (fabric, historical)
- Significant components: kitchen/kitchen house, garden/grounds, driveway, roof/ridge ventilator/s / fleche/s, residential accommodation – main house, fence/wall – perimeter

Wolverton is a heritage-listed detached house at 95 Stagpole Street, West End, City of Townsville, Queensland, Australia. It was built c. 1903. It was added to the Queensland Heritage Register on 21 October 1992.

== History ==
Wolverton, a single-storeyed, decorative timber residence, was constructed c. 1903 for Thomas Turton, a well known Townsville painter and decorator. The architect and builder are unknown.

Turton, Savage & Co., painters and glaziers, and glass, oil and colour merchants, had established a business in Flinders Street, Townsville, by c. 1889. The business proved successful, and for over 30 years Thomas Turton was Townsville's principal painter and decorator.

It appears that Turton's private residence, Wolverton, was erected c. 1903. Title to the West End property was transferred to Emily Helen Elizabeth Turton, Thomas' wife, in mid-1903, and Thomas Turton is listed as resident in Stagpole Street in the 1904 Queensland Post Office Directory.

The original structure is thought to have comprised two large rooms divided by a central hallway, surrounded by verandahs, with a detached kitchen at the rear. Later the rear verandah was enclosed and an additional wing added. Wolverton was one of only five Federation-era timber houses with a distinctive multi-gabled roofline, built in Townsville. One of these has been demolished, another shifted to a rural site; the three (including Wolverton) remaining in Townsville have been refurbished.

Thomas and Emily Turton resided at Wolverton until c. 1916, after which the house appears to have been rented out. Title was transferred from Mrs Turton in 1925, and the property passed through a variety of owners and lessees in subsequent years. It is understood the house was moved sideways in the 1930s to create a vacant adjacent block and in the 1950s it was divided into two flats. In the 1980s Wolverton was restored to its pre-1950 appearance.

== Description ==
Wolverton is a modest, single-storeyed timber residence, high set on concrete stumps, surrounded by a modern tropical garden of ferns, palms, shade trees and lawn. A semi-circular driveway is a feature of the front yard together with the original concrete fence foundation and posts.

The building has a complex hipped and gabled roof. There are two small symmetrically placed gables at the front of the house and a gabled frontispiece which extends through the front verandah. A large square ventilator is centrally placed on the ridge of the corrugated iron roof. The verandah, with dowel balustrading and lattice screening, extends around three sides of the building. The front porch is decorated with simple fretwork and a wooden arch over the front steps. The single-skin timber external walls have exposed framing. Boards have also been used throughout the house on the internal walls and ceilings.

== Heritage listing ==
Wolverton was listed on the Queensland Heritage Register on 21 October 1992 having satisfied the following criteria.

The place is important in demonstrating the evolution or pattern of Queensland's history.

Wolverton, a prestigious timber residence erected c. 1903 during the expansion of Townsville as a port for the mineral rich rural hinterland, illustrates the pattern of Queensland's history.

The place demonstrates rare, uncommon or endangered aspects of Queensland's cultural heritage.

It is significant in demonstrating the principal characteristics of a Federation-era timber residence with distinctive multi-gabled roof and timber decorative detailing, unusual in Townsville, and is one of a group of only three such residences surviving in the city.

The place is important in demonstrating the principal characteristics of a particular class of cultural places.

It is significant in demonstrating the principal characteristics of a Federation-era timber residence with distinctive multi-gabled roof and timber decorative detailing, unusual in Townsville, and is one of a group of only three such residences surviving in the city.

The place is important because of its aesthetic significance.

Wolverton is a highly decorative building, and makes a distinctive aesthetic contribution to the suburban townscape of Townsville's West End.
