= La Muse =

Artists' community in Labastide-Esparbairenque, France

- Formation: May 2001
- Type: Artist colony
- Purpose: To inspire creativity by giving an opportunity to artists and writers to work in peace in a supportive and peaceful mountain environment
- Headquarters: Labastide-Esparbairenque, France
- Region served: International
- Website: lamuseretreat.com

La Muse is an artists' community located in Labastide-Esparbairenque, France.

It is a manor house in a small village in the mountains, 25 minutes drive from Carcassonne. It is in the Cathar region.

The residence offers retreats to artists and writers working in fiction, non-fiction, musical composition, painting, performance art, photography, printmaking, sculpture, and video, choreography, film, as well as crafts and arts.

It has an art studio and a chapel that residents can access.

The average length of a residency is 3 weeks.

La Muse is a member of Res Artis, the worldwide network of artists residencies.

== History ==
The manor house dates from the 12th century. It was bought in 2001 by writers John Fanning and Kerry Eielson. In the years that followed the artist residence has expanded to the neighbouring cottages, accommodating to the need of couples and single parents with children.

The name of the retreat was inspired by the nine muses, each room in the main house named after a muse.

=== Artists' colony ===
Fanning and Eielson created La Muse as a low cost, inclusive retreat for writers and artists to have unstructured, uninterrupted time to focus on themselves and their work.

Some of the artists and writers who have created at La Muse have been awarded many prizes and awards, some examples being Andrew Miller, John Clanchy, Daniel K. Brown, Xu Xi, Robin Hemley, and Robert Olmstead.
