= Currajong, West End =

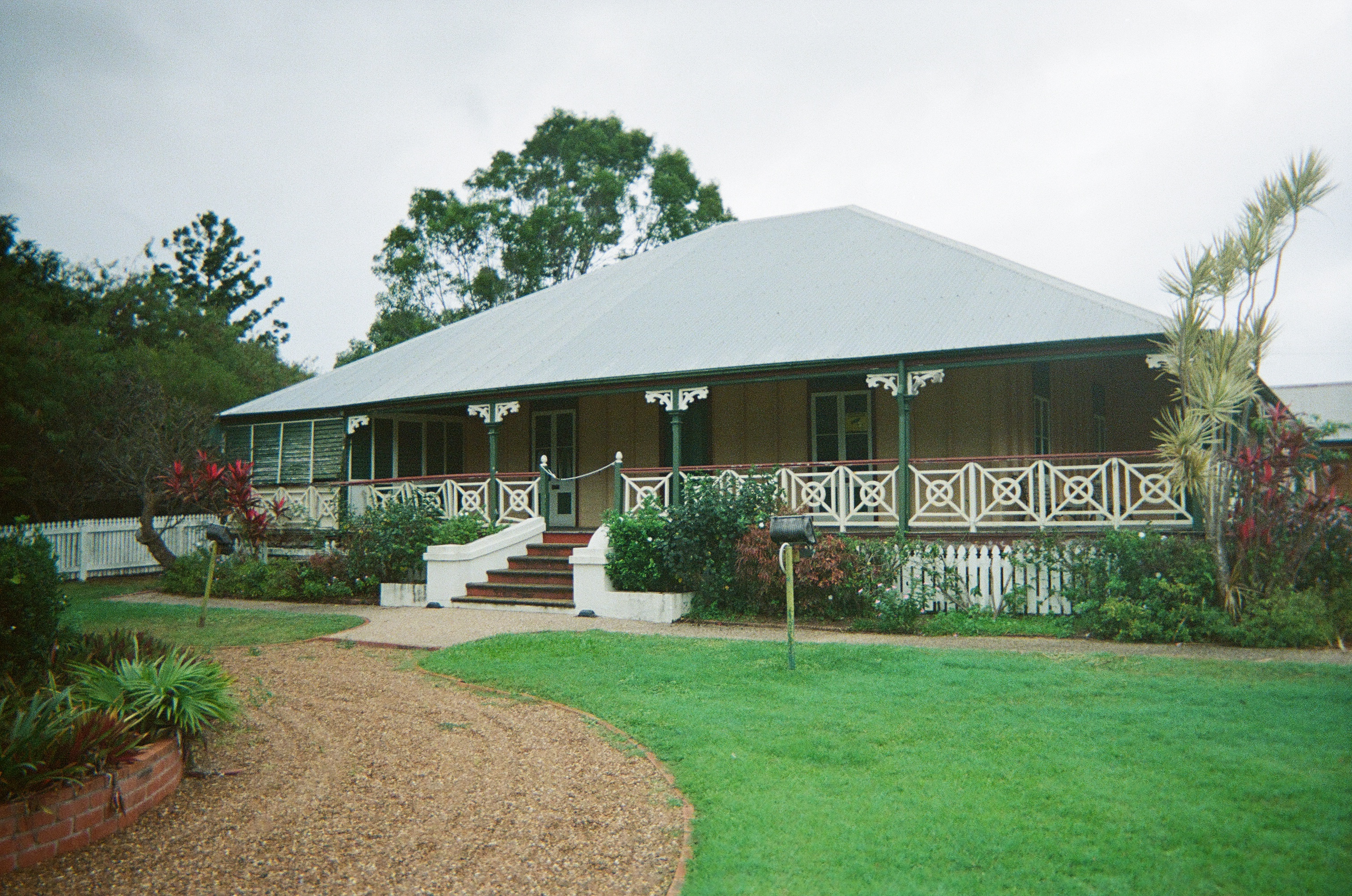
- The house in 2025

- Location within Queensland Location within Australia
- 19.2707°S 146.8024°E
- Location: 5 Castling Street, West End, City of Townsville, Queensland, Australia

History
- Design period: 1870s–1890s (late 19th century)
- Built: 1887–1888
- Built for: Alfred Mackenzie

Queensland Heritage Register
- Official name: Currajong
- Type: state heritage (built)
- Designated: 21 October 1992
- Reference no.: 600884
- Significant period: 1880s (fabric); 1880s, 1940s (historical); 1950s–1970s (social)
- Significant components: residential accommodation – main house

Currajong is a heritage-listed detached house at 5 Castling Street, West End, City of Townsville, Queensland, Australia. It was built from 1887 to 1888. It was added to the Queensland Heritage Register on 21 October 1992.

== History ==
Currajong is a large, single-storeyed timber residence which was built between 1887 and 1888 for Alfred MacKenzie who was a manager of the Australian Joint Stock Bank and had been a pioneer of the sugar industry in north Queensland. It was initially situated amongst other suburban villas in the then fashionable area along the road to Charters Towers.

In 1885, subsection 4 of section 3 of portion 2A parish of Coonambelah was purchased from the estate of Robert Towns by Gilbert Francis Elliott. The following year he sold the land to his brother-in-law, Alfred Peter MacKenzie. In 1870, MacKenzie, together with his brother and sister, had pioneered sugar growing at Gairloch, near the present town of Ingham. It was not successful and MacKenzie worked for the AJS Bank at Charters Towers before being appointed to the branch in Townsville. At sometime during the period between September 1887, when MacKenzie was living in Stanton Hill, and during October 1888 when he wrote to the Divisional Board from his new property on the Fullham Road, Currajong was built.

In 1889, MacKenzie was transferred to Toowoomba and the property was sold in 1890 to Alfred Hunt. Hunt had major interests in mining and had been a member of the partnership which owned the Great Cumberland Mine at Georgetown. This had been sold in 1885 at a great profit and the proceeds financed investments in the pastoral industry, including Carpentaria Downs. Currajong is said to have been named after seedlings brought by Hunt from Carpentaria Downs to plant around the house. While in Townsville, Hunt was a director of the North Queensland Meat Export and Agency Company, the Townsville Newspaper Company (publisher of the Townsville Daily Bulletin and the North Queensland Herald) and the Townsville Gas and Coke Company. He died in 1901 and his widow, Mary, continued to live at Currajong until she died in 1926.

In March 1926 the house was sold to John Joseph Fanning who was well known in business circles as the North Queensland manager of the National Mutual Life Assurance Company. He was also an identity in racing circles and rode as an amateur jockey and show rider. He owned horses and was a highly regarded judge of them. During his day, the stables at Currajong were well known. He was transferred to Brisbane in 1929 and died in 1931, whereon Currajong passed to James and Jessie Ferguson, whose background was in the pastoral industry. They occupied the house until the outbreak of World War II, when it was requisitioned by the RAAF as a Medical Receiving Station.

In order to convert the building to a medical facility, some changes were made to the layout of the rooms, although the form of the building was not changed. As the core consisted of two rooms on either side of a central hall, two of which were linked by an open arch, the wall between two bedrooms on the other side was removed to create two large wards. An operating theatre was added and toilets and showers were installed.

Although the building was initially intended to act as a training centre, it saw urgent use in 1942 when it received casualties from the fighting at Milne Bay. In December 1944, it was decided that the medical centre was no longer needed and the staff vacated the house by January of the following year.

Mr and Mrs Ferguson did not return to the house after the war and it was purchased by the Redemptionist Fathers for use as a monastery in 1945. In 1955 the property passed to the Sisters of Mercy and the buildings of the new Mater Hospital were erected in the grounds over the next few years. Currajong, however, remained in use as a residence for the Sisters.

In 1978, the land on which Currajong stood was needed for the expansion of the hospital and the house was scheduled for demolition. A major effort by the local branch of the National Trust of Queensland, Townsville City Council and the Sisters of Mercy enabled the house to be saved. A Federal grant was also secured to enable its transference to a new site at Castling Street, West End.

== Description ==
Currajong is now located at 5 Castling Street, West End as part of a museum complex which includes a miner's cottage and a 1920s farmhouse. Currajong backs onto the street, overlooking Council parkland. It is a large, single storeyed timber dwelling raised on low brick piers. It has a hipped roof clad in corrugated iron. The house is surrounded by wide verandahs supported by timber posts with decorative brackets and cross braced balustrading. There is a timber staircase with matching balustrading at the side of the house. The main stair to the front entrance is cement rendered and curves to widen at ground level.

The house contains seven rooms, two with verandah annexes. The core consists of four rooms paired on either side of a hall. An arched opening divides the rooms which originally were dining and drawing rooms.

It is interpreted as a conjectural Townsville interior furnished to demonstrate the lifestyle of an affluent family of the period.

== Heritage listing ==
Currajong was listed on the Queensland Heritage Register on 21 October 1992 having satisfied the following criteria.

- The place is important in demonstrating the evolution or pattern of Queensland's history.
- Currajong is significant for demonstrating the lifestyle of several families who were prominent in the development of north Queensland. Its conversion for use as a military medical facility in World War II reflects the importance of Townsville in the conduct of the war in the Pacific.
- The place is important in demonstrating the principal characteristics of a particular class of cultural places.

Although it has been relocated, Currajong is a good and early example of a large, late nineteenth century timber residence in Townsville.
