= Labastide-Esparbairenque =

Commune in Occitanie, France

- Commune
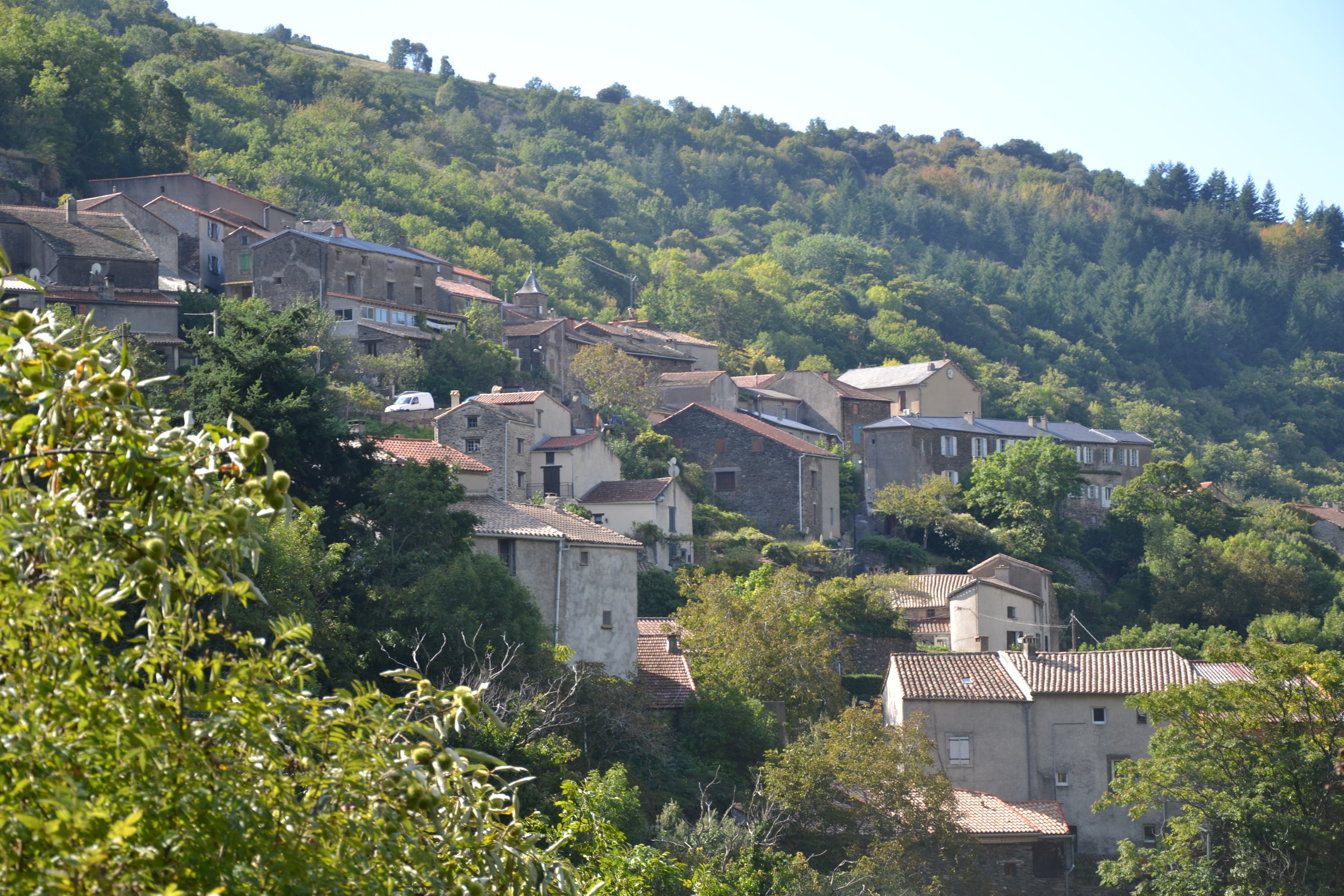
- A general view of Labastide

- Coat of arms
- Location of Labastide-Esparbairenque
- Location within France Location within Occitanie
- Coordinates: 43°22′54″N 2°23′45″E
- Country: France
- Region: Occitania
- Department: Aude
- Arrondissement: Carcassonne
- Canton: La Vallée de l'Orbiel

Government
  - Mayor (2020–2026): Marc Mahoux
- Area^{1}: 16.77 km^{2} (6.47 sq mi)
- Elevation: 450 m (1,480 ft)
- Highest elevation: 984 m (3,228 ft)
- Lowest elevation: 300 m (980 ft)
- Population (2023): 66
  - Density: 3.9/km^{2} (10/sq mi)
- Time zone: UTC+01:00 (CET)
  - Summer (DST): UTC+02:00 (CEST)
- INSEE/Postal code: 11180 /11380
- ^{1} French Land Register data, which excludes lakes, ponds, glaciers > 1 km^{2} (0.386 sq mi or 247 acres) and river estuaries.

Labastide-Esparbairenque (French pronunciation: [labastid ɛspaʁbeʁɛ̃k]; Occitan: La Bastida Esparveirenca) is a commune in the Aude department in southern France.

The artist colony in the village, La Muse, was set up 16 years ago, by the writers John Fanning and Kerry Eielson.

== Population ==
Historical population
Year	Pop.	±% p.a.
1968	113	—
1975	90	−3.20%
1982	86	−0.65%
1990	94	+1.12%
1999	103	+1.02%
2007	85	−2.37%
2012	84	−0.24%
2017	73	−2.77%
2023	66	−1.67%
Source: INSEE

== See also ==
- Communes of the Aude department
