= Anna Maria Desmond =

(1839–1921) nun and teacher

Anna Maria Desmond (1839–1921), in religion Sister Francis Xavier, was a Roman Catholic nun and teacher in Queensland, Australia. She was the Mother Superior of St Patrick's Convent in Townsville and was involved in establishing schools in Queensland.

Anna Maria Desmond originally took her vows in with the name Sister Francis Xavier but it was changed to Sister Benigna on her voyage to Australia in 1872 as there was another Sister Francis Xavier onboard. She arrived in Brisbane in May 1872 and in 1873 went to Rockhampton to help establish a convent. From 1874 to 1878, she did charity and taught music in Brisbane.

In 1879, Sister Beninga with the Sisters of Mercy went to Townsville and reopened St Joseph's School at the beginning of the school year and became leader of the community.
