= Green Street bunker =

Bunker in West End, Townsville, Queensland, Australia

Coordinates: 19°15′28.08″S 146°47′36.48″E

The Green Street bunker at West End (Townsville), Queensland, Australia is also known as the Sidney Street bunker and Project 81. It was built by the Royal Australian Air Force during World War II.

The erection of the Green Street bunker (Project 81) at the end of Sidney Street in West End was approved on 12 March 1942.

The road up Castle Hill was closed to traffic on about 12 March 1942 to ensure the construction of military facilities such as this bunker were not obvious. The bunker was completed about 12 weeks later. The bunker was fully air-conditioned during its use in World War II.

== Buildings/rooms ==
Aerial view of bunker circa 1944

There were 17 buildings at Project 81 as follows:-

- 1 Guard Room
- 2 Old dilapidated weather board cottage, Airmens Quarters
- 3 Prefabricated Hut G.I. Roof - Met Store Room
- 4 Latrine
- 5 G.I. Shed
- 6 Weather board Building G.I. Roof General Offices
- 7 Canteen
- 8 W.A.A.F. Mess Room
- 9 Airman's Mess Room

Green St bunker/ SES centre

- 10 Guard House
- 11 Latrines
- 12 Air Conditioning Plant
- 13 Area Operations Room and General Offices
- 14 Photographic Intelligence Section
- 15 G.I. Shed
- 16 Weather Board Building G.I. Room
- 17 25 Yard Range Mound

It is believed that the bunker was used as No. 24 Squadron RAAF Headquarters and by the RAAF Operations and Signals group (Intelligence). The building (120 ft x 60 ft) was built like a fortress, with enormous thick walls and roof. It was apparently capable of sustaining a direct hit with minimal damage.

the rooftop residence- designed as camouflage

The rooms in the bunkers were used as follows:-

- Emergency Power Plant
- Intelligence Officer
- Meteorological Officer
- Meteorological Room
- Navigation Officer
- Crew Room
- Operations Room
- Cypher Room
- Signals Office
- Receiving Room
- Signals Officer
- Men's Lavatory
- Telephone Exchange
- Strong Room

Two other rooms separated by a walkway were:-

- Fan Room
- Condenser Room

== Construction ==
600 cubic yards of concrete and 50 tons of reinforcing steel was used to construct the Green Street bunker.

Four timber buildings were located nearby and one was located on top of the bunker to give it the appearance of a domestic residence from an enemy aerial view. The bunker was well camouflaged and camouflage netting would have been attached from the roofline of the bunker.

The bunker also had its own very large electricity generating plant. A small separate building at the end of the bunker and adjacent to the Generator room, housed the air conditioning plant. It had a sunken floor and you would walk down a small flight of stairs into the room.

== Staff accounts ==
Circa 2006

WAAAF Helen Ena Suttie worked in the W/T Station, Townsville and 12 Signals Unit in North Eastern Area Command Headquarters in Sturt Street Townsville. On a few occasions Helen was taken by tender on duty to a secret abode (possibly the Green Street bunker).

Over the years various reports of secret bunkers and tunnels in Castle Hill and Mount Louisa have been received including a tunnel near the Green Street bunker.

Another one of the many rumours about secret tunnels in Castle Hill suggested that there was an entrance in the floor of the Green Street bunker. In 1985 a section of the floor of this bunker was dug up in a forlorn attempt to find the secret tunnel.

In the early 1960s this complex was used as the 10 Sqn Radio Section workshop. This was while a new building was being constructed at the Garbutt Base near the end of the main runway. The new building was occupied in early 1964. Sqn Ldr K Fraser the Senior Radio Officer lived in the house on top of the building with his family during this time.

== SES centre ==
The Townsville City Council purchased the Green Street bunker from the Department of Defence in about October 2001 for $50,000. In March 2001, the Townsville and Thuringowa Councils approved a joint 5-year plan for a $839,000 upgrade of the old bunker. This included repairs to the leaking roof, internal and external renovations, painting, new carports and the installation of a new generator. This was an initiative of the Townsville and Thuringowa Counter Disaster Committee. The Townsville Amateur Radio Club have occupied the upstairs section for many years.

== Other buildings ==
Officers Quarters & Mess (35 & 33 Stagpole St)

The Commonwealth Government hired a some premises at 63 Stagpole Street in West End that were possible used for NCO quarters. The sites of 35 and 33 Stagpole St was possible used as Officers quarters and mess.

A bunker of identical design to the Green St. Bunker, but with an external buttress bomb blast wall was built as the Operations and Signals Building (Message Center) at Ramsay Street in Garbutt. No. 2 US Air Command, possibly under the command of Brigadier General Martin F. Scanlon, USAAF was located in that bunker.
