= Yongala Lodge =

Yongala Lodge, North Ward
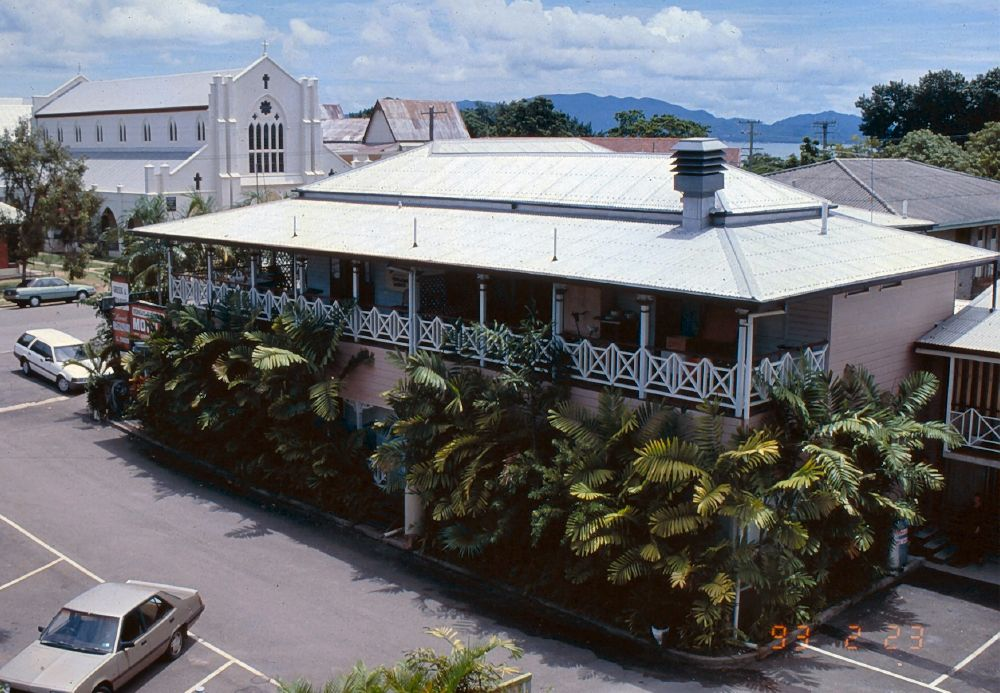
- Yongala Lodge, 1993

- Location within Queensland Location within Australia
- 19.2538°S 146.8177°E
- Location: 11 Fryer Street, North Ward, City of Townsville, Queensland, Australia

History
- Design period: 1870s–1890s (late 19th century)
- Built: c. 1883–1930s

Site notes
- Architect: Rooney Brothers

Queensland Heritage Register
- Official name: Yongala Lodge, Lister Private Hospital, Matthew Rooney's Residence, Nestle Private Hospital
- Type: state heritage (built)
- Designated: 21 August 1992
- Reference no.: 600878
- Significant period: 1880s–1930s (fabric); 1880s–1920s (historical); 1910s–1920s (social)
- Significant components: service wing, residential accommodation – main house
- Builders: Rooney Brothers

Yongala Lodge is a heritage-listed detached house at 11 Fryer Street, North Ward, City of Townsville, Queensland, Australia. It was designed by Rooney Brothers and was built by the Rooney Brothers from c. 1883 to 1930s. It is also known as Lister Private Hospital, Matthew Rooney's Residence, and Nestle Private Hospital. It was added to the Queensland Heritage Register on 21 August 1992.

== History ==
The earliest section of this two-storeyed, former residence was erected between 1883 and 1887, on land acquired by Townsville builders and timber merchants John and Matthew Rooney, in mid-1883.

In the late 1860s, Irish immigrants John and Jacob Rooney had established a building and timber-milling business at Maryborough, where later they were joined by their brother Matthew. In the late 1870s John and Matthew established a branch of J & J Rooney, builders, at Townsville, which was developing as the port for the Ravenswood and Charters Towers goldfields. In 1882 John and Matthew established their own business interests at Townsville, setting up the firms of Rooney Bros (architects, builders and contractors) and, in partnership with James Harvey, the timber-milling enterprise of Rooney & Co. By the mid-1880s they were operating their own fleet of small vessels to bring timber from Maryborough and other Queensland ports to their mill and factory on Ross Creek.

By controlling every stage of the building process - logging, milling, prefabrication, design, construction, hardware supply, and later furniture manufacture and paint sales -and by adopting highly mechanised production techniques and large volume turnovers, Rooneys' dominated the North Queensland building industry until the early years of the 20th century.

Matthew Rooney's house in Fryer Street exhibits decorative finishes typical of a Rooney building - including the distinctive cast-iron balustrading and the remnant timber moulding of the lower verandah frieze - and was one of few two-storeyed, timber residences erected in Townsville before the turn-of-the-century. Constructed entirely of Oregon pine, initially it comprised two rooms on each floor, with a single-storeyed kitchen house at the rear, and verandahs front and back. By 1900 the kitchen house had been replaced with a two-storeyed rear extension, and verandahs had been added at the rear and along the northeast side. Part of the latter was enclosed.

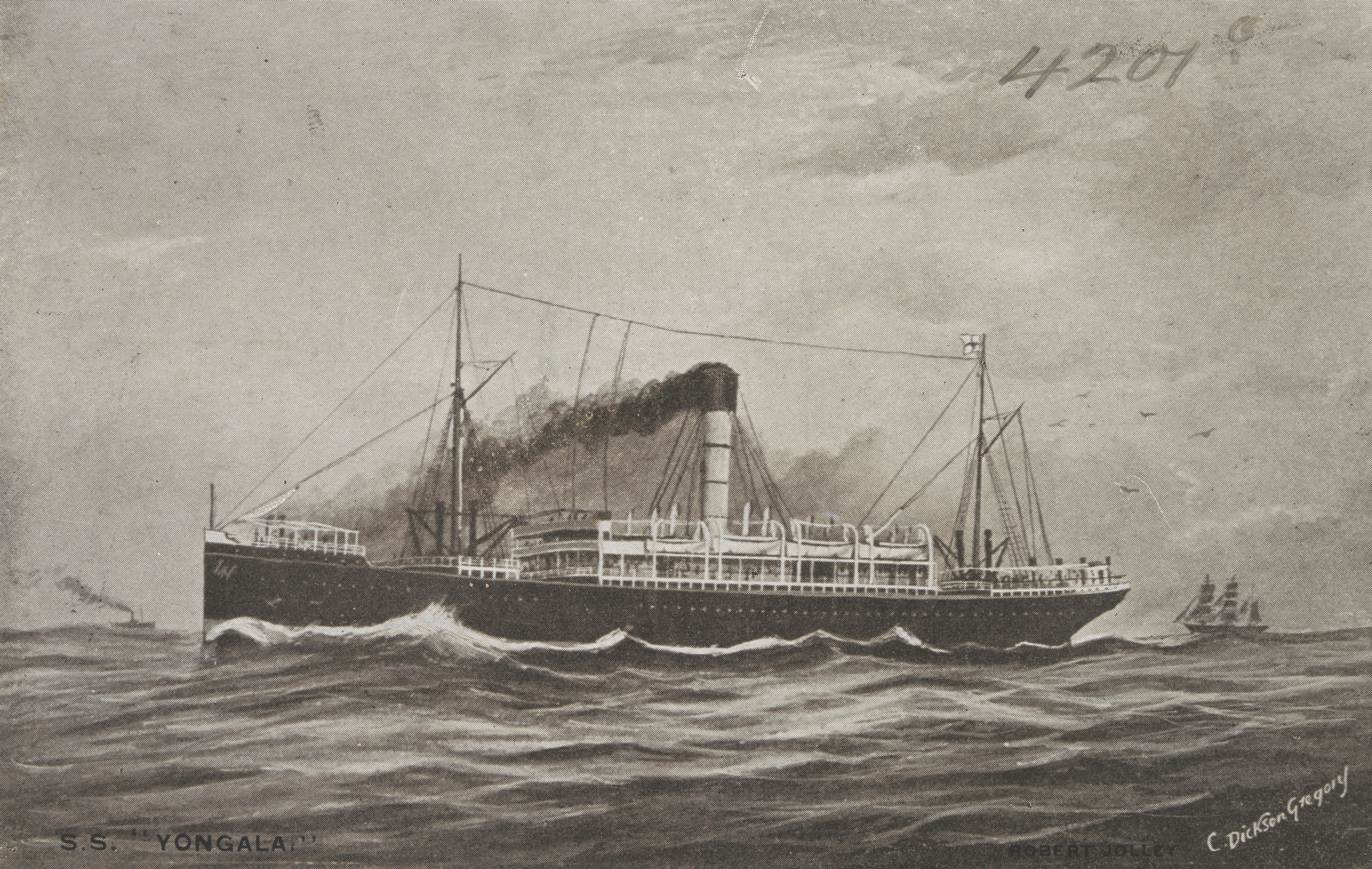
SS Yongala, 1906

Rooney and his family do not appear to have occupied the Fryer Street residence until the early 1890s. Matthew Rooney was a prominent Townsville citizen, first chairman of the Townsville Harbour Board, 1896–97, and a strong supporter of the Catholic Church. On 23 March 1911 he, his wife and his youngest daughter were drowned in the wreck of the SS Yongala, south of Townsville. The Rooney firms were already losing their pre-eminence in the North Queensland building industry, and after Matthew's death, declined rapidly. The heirs reconstructed as Rooneys Limited, concentrating on building prefabrication initially, then furniture manufacture and retail trading, until winding up the firm in 1946.

In 1916 the Fryer Street house was leased to matron Katherine Terry, who converted it into the Nestle Private Hospital (renamed Lister Private Hospital by 1919). In 1926 Rooneys Ltd sold the property, which coincides with its conversion to Lister Flats. Between c.1925 and c.1933 a two-storeyed enclosed verandah was added to the southwestern side, and a single-storeyed extension at the rear probably dates to the mid to late 1930s.

In the early 1980s the building was renovated as part of the Yongala Lodge motel.

== Description ==
Yongala lodge is a two-storeyed, L-shaped timber building which is currently used as a restaurant and managers residence. The building is located at the base of Melton Hill and fronts Fryer Street to the northwest.

The building has a hipped corrugated iron roof and is surrounded by two-storeyed verandahs, with the southeast side being enclosed. The original central section of the building has decorative cross-braced cast iron balustrade and single-skin, exposed frame construction. The later side verandahs have cross-braced timber balustrade and more recent timber brackets. Most of the northeast wall has been enclosed with chamferboard and a pergola structure attached to the northwest front. A decorative cantilevered timber porch with a concave corrugated iron awning has been added to the front entry. The rear of the building has been clad with vinyl boarding.

The main entry features a panelled timber door with patterned glass fan and sidelights surrounded by timber pilasters supporting a large cornice. French doors with fanlights open onto verandahs on both levels.

Internally, the building has a central corridor opening into dining rooms, a bar and kitchen. The dining area has had fretwork arches added, and existing arched openings have had their balustrade removed. A central stair, with turned timber balustrade and twin flights from the landing, leads to the first floor dining and the managers residence at the rear. A steel framed stair has been recently inserted on the southwest to meet fire regulations.

A lower two-storeyed brick motel wing is attached to the rear of the building. A higher, two-storeyed, split level brick motel block has been built on the site's rear rocky slope. An inground concrete swimming pool is located to south of the building surrounded by bitumen driveway and car parking.

The southern section of the site consists of a steep rocky slope at the base of Melton Hill.

== Heritage listing ==
Yongala Lodge was listed on the Queensland Heritage Register on 21 August 1992 having satisfied the following criteria.

The place is important in demonstrating the evolution or pattern of Queensland's history.

The manager's residence/restaurant of Yongala Lodge has a strong historical connection with early Townsville builder and businessman Matthew Rooney, who, through the family building firms of Rooney Bros and Rooney & Co., made a substantial contribution to the development of North Queensland in the latter part of the 19th and early 20th centuries. Constructed for Matthew Rooney in the mid-1880s, and occupied by him and his family, the building is important in illustrating the work of these important North Queensland building industry firms, and was one of the few two-storeyed, timber residences erected in 19th century Townsville.

The place demonstrates rare, uncommon or endangered aspects of Queensland's cultural heritage.

It is now even more rare, being the only identified, 19th century, two-storeyed residence to survive in Townsville, and retains sufficient original fabric to be illustrative of its type.

The place is important in demonstrating the principal characteristics of a particular class of cultural places.

In addition, the building contains some elements of individual architectural merit including the finely detailed staircase and entrance, the cantilevered porch and the construction technique of exposed framing.

The place is important because of its aesthetic significance.

The building makes an aesthetic contribution to the streetscape of Fryer Street, particularly in the quality of some of its architectural elements, including the cast iron balustrade, main entry door and surround.

The place has a special association with the life or work of a particular person, group or organisation of importance in Queensland's history.

The manager's residence/restaurant of Yongala Lodge has a strong historical connection with early Townsville builder and businessman Matthew Rooney, who, through the family building firms of Rooney Bros and Rooney & Co., made a substantial contribution to the development of North Queensland in the latter part of the 19th and early 20th centuries. Constructed for Matthew Rooney in the mid-1880s, and occupied by him and his family, the building is important in illustrating the work of these important North Queensland building industry firms, and was one of the few two-storeyed, timber residences erected in 19th century Townsville.
