= West End, Queensland (Townsville) =

West End
- Suburb
- Interactive map of West End
- Coordinates: 19.2649°S 146.7927°E
- Country: Australia
- State: Queensland
- City: Townsville
- LGA: City of Townsville
- Location: 3.7 km (2.3 mi) W of Townsville CBD; 1,358 km (844 mi) NNW of Brisbane

Government
  - State electorate: Townsville
  - Federal division: Herbert

Area
  - Total: 3.1 km^{2} (1.2 sq mi)

Population
  - Total: 3,891 (2021 census)
  - Density: 1,255/km^{2} (3,250/sq mi)
- Time zone: UTC+10:00 (AEST)
- Postcode: 4810
Suburbs around West End
Belgian Gardens	Castle Hill	Castle Hill
Garbutt	West End	Townsville City
Currajong	Pimlico; Hyde Park	Railway Estate; Hermit Park

West End is an inner suburb of Townsville in the City of Townsville, Queensland, Australia. In the 2021 census, West End had a population of 3,891 people.

== Geography ==
West End is situated at the base of Castle Hill (the hill). North Townsville Road runs along the southern boundary, and North Ward Road runs inside the western boundary.

== History ==
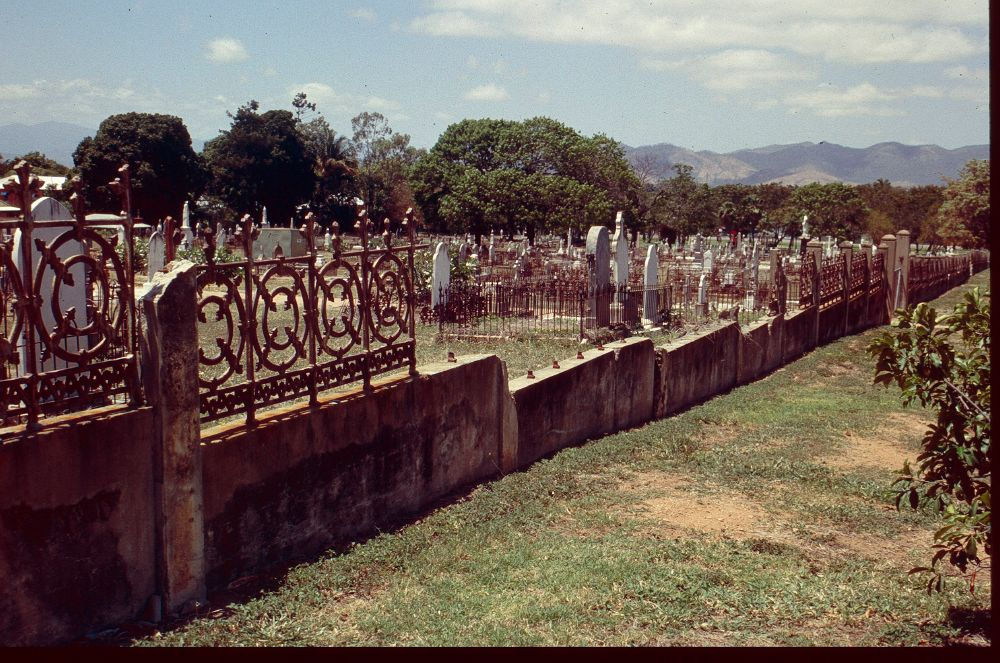
West End Cemetery

The first Townsville cemetery is located in West End. One area was used for "unsanctified burials" where Aboriginal, Chinese and Jewish people were buried; suicides were also buried there.

During World War 2, the massive Green Street bunker was used by the RAAF. It is now the State Emergency Service building.

Townsville West State School opened on 21 March 1887 and celebrated its centenary in 1987.

St Mary's School opened on 1 October 1888. In 1995, it was amalgamated into The Marian School in Currajong.

Townsville West Special School opened on 29 September 1958 and closed on 21 December 1992.

Townsville Flexible Learning Centre opened on 23 January 2006.

== Demographics ==
In the 2011 census, West End had a population of 4,242 people.

In the 2016 census, West End had a population of 4,064 people.

In the 2021 census, West End had a population of 3,891 people.

== Education ==
Townsville West State School is a government primary (Prep–6) school for boys and girls at Wilson Street (19.2672°S 146.8042°E). In 2018, the school had an enrolment of 111 students with 13 teachers (8 full-time equivalent) and 11 non-teaching staff (6 full-time equivalent).

Townsville Flexible Learning Centre is a Catholic secondary (7–12) school for boys and girls at 26 Ingham Road (19.2688°S 146.8032°E). In 2018, the school had an enrolment of 134 students with 15 teachers (11 full-time equivalent) and 15 non-teaching staff (10 full-time equivalent).

There are no government secondary schools in West End. The nearest government secondary schools are Townsville State High School in neighbouring Railway Estate to the south-east and Pimlico State High School in Gulliver to the south-west.

There are numerous non-government school in Townsville's suburbs.

== Heritage listings ==
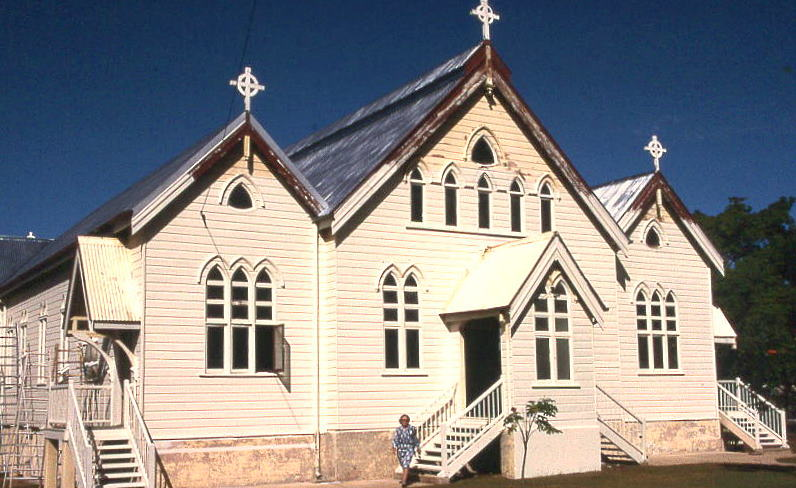
St Marys Church, West End

West End has a number of heritage-listed sites, including:

- Currajong (house), 5 Castling Street
- West End Cemetery, Francis Street
- former RAAF Operations Building Site, Green Street
- Townsville West State School, 29 Ingham Road
- St Mary's Church & Convent, 34 Ingham Road
- Townsville Showground, 72–104 Ingham Road
- West End Hotel, 89 Ingham Road
- Wolverton (house), 95 Stagpole Street
