= John Joseph Fanning =

Irish-Australian equestrian (1874–1931)

Jack Fanning
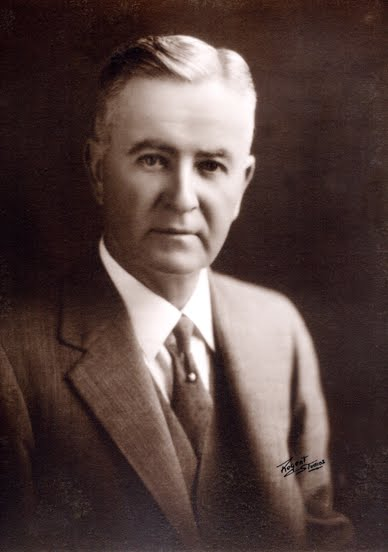
- Born: John Joseph Fanning; 1874|04|27; Clara, King's County (Offaly), Ireland
- Died: 1931|06|14 aged 57; Auchenflower, Brisbane, Queensland
- Burial place: Toowong Cemetery
- Education: Bowen Boys State School
- Occupation: Insurance Manager Equestrian Judge Horse Trader Amateur Jockey Turf Club Official Show Association President Civic Leader.
- Years active: 36 years
- Employer: National Mutual Life Association of Australasia (NMLA)
- Organization(s): North Queensland Amateur Turf Club, Founder and Secretary Townsville Turf Club, Committee Member and Steward Bowen Turf Club, Member Townsville Pastoral Agricultural and Industrial Association (TPA&IA), President Rotary Club of Townsville, Founding Member
- Board member of: Townsville Electric Tramway Company
- Spouse: Robeina Margaret Treen Frances Mary Lowth
- Children: 11
- Parent: Joseph Fanning Mary Carey

John Joseph Fanning (27 April 1874 – 14 June 1931) was an Irish-Australian insurance manager, equestrian judge, horse trader, amateur jockey and civic leader. Well known in North Queensland’s pastoral and racing circles, he served 36 years with the National Mutual Life Association of Australasia (NMLA), rising from a clerk to Northern District Manager, and later a senior role in Brisbane. His equestrian career spanned ownership, judging, and trading across all horse classes - ponies, hacks, thoroughbreds, and draught horses - while his civic contributions shaped Townsville’s infrastructure and community life. Fanning’s legacy reflects the Irish diaspora’s resilience and his pivotal role in Queensland’s colonial development.

== Early life and emigration ==
Fanning was born on 27 April 1874 in Clara, King’s County (now Offaly), Ireland, the eldest of eleven children of Joseph Fanning, a carpenter, and Mary Carey, a dressmaker. Raised in a Catholic household in a textile town of approximately 1,000 citizens, dominated by the Goodbody family’s jute mills, he grew up amid Ireland’s post-Famine economic struggles. His siblings included Mary Elizabeth (b. 1876), Michael (b. 1878), Elizabeth (b. 1879), Joseph (b. 1880), Patrick Joseph (c. 1882), Thomas Francis (b. 1883), and four Australian-born siblings: Frances (b. 1886), James Eugene (b. 1888), Charles Duncan (b. 1890), and Alice (b. 1893).

On 18 June 1883, aged 9, Fanning emigrated with his family aboard the SS Nowshera from Plymouth, England, to Bowen, Queensland, enduring an 88-day voyage marked by disease and the distant Krakatoa eruption. Arriving on 14 September 1883, the family settled in Powell Street in Bowen, a port town of 2,500 with a bustling cattle and sugar trade. Fanning’s education at Bowen Boys State School was practical, shaped by frontier life, including recovery from an 1884 unnamed tropical cyclone. His passion for horses emerged early, and by his teens, he was competing successfully in show jumping contests in Charters Towers with his pony Dandy.

== Insurance career ==
=== Early career and rise ===
In 1895, aged 20, Fanning joined the NMLA in Townsville as a clerk under branch manager William James Affleck, transitioning from casual railway work in Charters Towers. Hired after a chance meeting outside the Flinders Street office, he quickly proved his worth. In 1898, aged 23, he embarked on a 5,000-mile buckboard buggy trek across North Queensland and the Northern Territory with Dr. William Berryhill, NMLA’s medical officer, securing policies from many pastoralists including outback pioneers like Donald MacIntyre and Ernest Henry. His charisma, exemplified by singing and racing at Bourke’s Tank, won significant contracts. In early 1902, aged 27, Fanning succeeded Affleck as Northern District Manager, a role he held for 27 years, transforming the Townsville branch into Queensland’s most significant outside Brisbane. Under his leadership, NMLA’s funds grew from £1 million in 1890 to over £4 million by 1904, with £427,476 in new policies in 1904 alone. He reduced high northern premiums, broadening access, and his agents covered vast regions from Port Darwin to remote stations. By 1912, headquarters approved £2,080 for office expansions, reflecting his success.

=== Later career ===
In December 1928, aged 54, Fanning transferred to Brisbane in a senior NMLA role, leveraging his northern expertise in the company’s new National Mutual Life Building, Brisbane in Queen Street. His tenure saw NMLA loan £20,000 to Townsville Council for electrical upgrades and fund the Fire Brigade, underscoring his influence. A 1905 staff photograph and a 1906 Sydney portrait, taken during a likely business or equestrian trip, highlight his growing prominence.

== Equestrian career ==
=== Racing and ownership ===
Fanning was a leading figure in Queensland’s equestrian and horse racing community, competing as an amateur jockey, race horse owner and committee member with the Townsville Turf Club, Bowen Turf Club, and founding member and secretary of North Queensland Amateur Turf Club. His stable included ponies (Smoker, Dandy), hacks (Akbar, Lady Grace), thoroughbreds (Sapper, Sunray, Corinda, The Farmer), and draught horses (Ironclad). Smoker, a pony, won 74 show contests by 1905, excelling in hack and high jump categories. Akbar, co-owned with pastoralist James Simpson Love, won the championship hack ribbon at the 1910 Townsville Pastoral and Agricultural Show and was ridden by King George V at the 1911 Delhi Durbar, a historic achievement for Queensland breeding. Sunray secured multiple victories in Brisbane and Townsville, while Ironclad, a Clydesdale, won draught horse competitions at Bowen.

=== Akbar and the 1911 Delhi Durbar ===
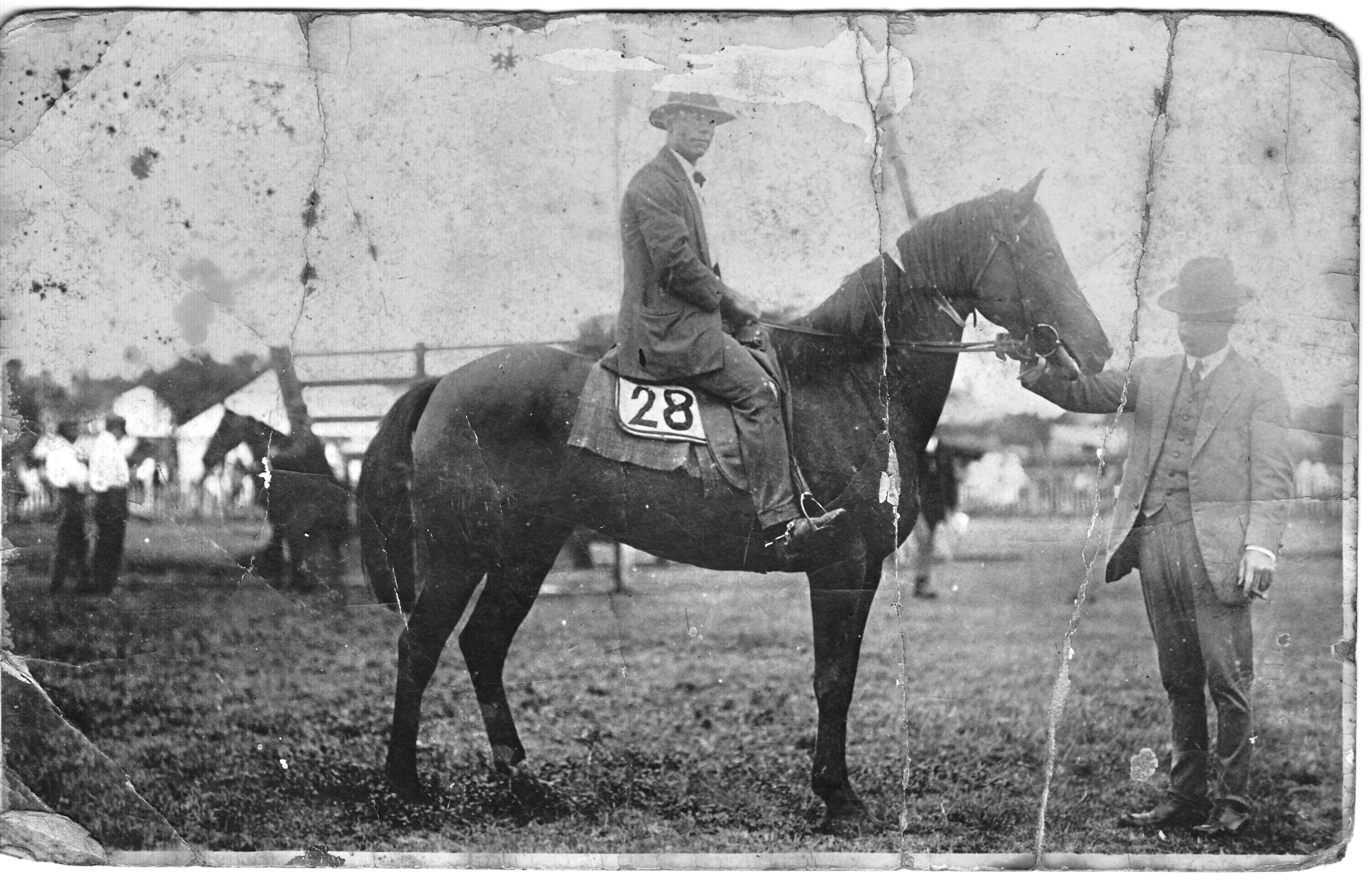
Akbar Winner 1911 Townsville Show

Originally bred by J.T.M. Bell at Coochin Coochin Station, Akbar won championships at the 1909–1910 Brisbane Exhibitions, ridden by Bell’s daughters Una and Enid. Acquired by Fanning and Love in 1911, Akbar secured the hack championship at the Townsville Show, ridden sidesaddle by Mrs. Macmillan of Lochinvar Station, judged by Fanning. Selected by Ernest Baynes for King George V’s use at the 1911 Delhi Durbar, Akbar was shipped to India by James Simpson Love aboard the SS Sarada on 20 September 1911, arriving 23 November. On 12 December 1911, the King rode Akbar during the Durbar’s proclamation, a triumph for Queensland breeding. Fanning’s role was affirmed in 1990 by Mrs. A.G. Bell, though her account omitted prior Bell ownership. This elevated Fanning’s reputation in the Indian Remount trade.

=== Judging and trading ===
As a judge, Fanning officiated as a judge at major events, including Sydney’s Royal Easter Show and Brisbane’s Royal National Agricultural Show (RNA), earning respect for his expertise across all horse classes. He praised horses like Don’s Pride for their “exceptional movement and conformation” at the RNA in 1931. His trading ventures, often with partners like James Simpson Love and Donald MacIntyre, extended to India, Papua New Guinea and the Philippines, exporting thoroughbreds and draught horses. In 1926, he negotiated the sale of draught horses to Papua New Guinea, enhancing agricultural development. His stable at "Currajong," purchased in 1926, became a hub for breeding and training, where he crossed thoroughbreds and hacks to produce versatile show horses.

=== Partnerships ===
Fanning’s partnership with James Simpson Love was central to his equestrian success, co-owning and racing horses like Akbar and Corinda, and co-judging events. His collaboration with MacIntyre facilitated sourcing quality stock, while his mentorship of younger breeders elevated North Queensland’s equestrian standards.. For many years he conducted business in partnership with Mr A C Luya, retired chairman of directors of the Queensland National Bank., trading in Australia and Papua New Guinea.

=== Belmont Park Jockey Club ===
In 1931, he was involved in the Belmont Park Jockey Club’s provisional committee, planning a new 2200m racecourse (11 furlongs) on a 320 acre property which had been secured and was situated between Carina und Belmont in Brisbane, that did not materialise.

== Civic contributions ==
=== Townsville leadership ===
From 1895 to 1929, Fanning was a cornerstone of Townsville’s civic life. He subscribed to the 1913 Townsville Electric Tramway Company IPO, supporting a £20,000 electrification project. As president of the Townsville Pastoral, Agricultural and Industrial Association (TPA&IA) in 1923, he oversaw £1,614 in Showgrounds upgrades, enhancing the region’s pastoral showcase.

He co-founded the Townsville Rotary Club in 1926 and hosted Governor Sir John Goodwin in 1928.

His trade visits to the Philippines in 1908 and to Papua New Guinea in 1912 gained wide recognition. His 1926 Rabaul trip as a Townsville Chamber of Commerce advocate secured steamer stops, boosting Townsville’s trade. He was President of the North Queensland Club.

== Property and legacy ==
Fanning purchased "Cloyne" in 1902 and the heritage-listed "Currajong" historic villa in Pimlico in 1926, which served as a centre for his equestrian and social activities. He sold "Currajong" for £2,501 in 1928 amid the Great Depression, marking his move to Brisbane.

== Personal life ==
Fanning married Robeina Margaret Treen on 6 March 1897 in Townsville. She died on 17 September 1898 during childbirth, leaving a daughter, Mary Margaret "Norma" (1898–1984). In August 1902, he married Frances Mary "Dot" Lowth at St. Mary’s in Bowen, raising ten children: Frances Mary (1904–1982), Margaret Elizabeth (1906–1994), Patrick John (1908–1973), Francis Joseph (1910–1981), Alice Monica (1912–1978), Olive Erin (1914–2002), Lawrence Stephen (1917–1994), Millicent Peace (1918–2006), Bernadette Patricia (1921–1998), and John Cyril (1926–). The family resided at "Cloyne" and later "Currajong" in Townsville, moving to Aldridge Street, Auchenflower, Brisbane, in 1928.

== Death and legacy ==
Fanning died suddenly on 14 June 1931 at his Auchenflower home, aged 57. His funeral at Toowong Cemetery, led by Rev. R. J. Murphy S.J., drew NMLA executives, RNA officials, and racing elites, including R. Stoddart, W. J. Affleck, and J. P. Bottomley. Survived by Dot (d. 1969) and ten of his eleven children, he was mourned as a “well-known sportsman” whose 36-year NMLA career, equestrian achievements, and civic leadership left an enduring mark on Queensland. His contributions to horse breeding and regional development, alongside the heritage-listed "Currajong," cemented his legacy.
