= St Mary's Church & Convent, Townsville =

St Mary's Church, Townsville
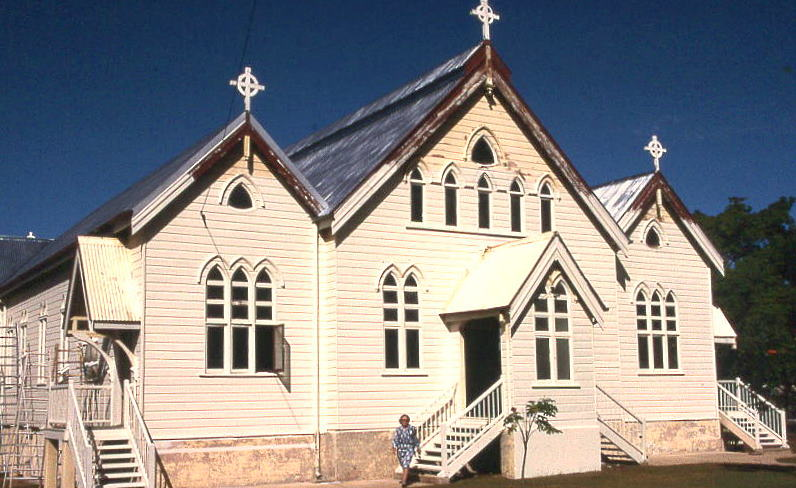
- St Mary's Church, 1988
- St Mary's Church, Townsville
- 19°16′09″S 146°48′09″E
- Address: 34 Ingham Road, West End, City of Townsville, Queensland
- Country: Australia
- Denomination: Roman Catholic

History
- Dedication: Mary, mother of Jesus

Architecture
- Architect: Rooney Brothers
- Architectural type: Church buildings
- Style: Gothic Revival
- Years built: c. 1880s–1923

Administration
- Archdiocese: Townsville
- Parish: Townsville

Queensland Heritage Register
- Official name: St Mary's Church & former Convent
- Type: State heritage (landscape, built)
- Designated: 2 January 1993
- Reference no.: 600879
- Significant period: 1880s–1910s, 1960s (historical) ongoing (social)
- Significant components: Church, convent/nunnery, trees/plantings, views to, school/school room, furniture/fittings
- Builders: Cowell & Holt

St Mary's Church and Convent are heritage-listed Roman Catholic church buildings at 34 Ingham Road, West End, City of Townsville, Queensland, Australia. It was designed by the Rooney Brothers and built by Cowell & Holt in 1888. It was added to the Queensland Heritage Register on 2 January 1993.

The church is functional as a parish church, while the former convent is now a private residence.

== History ==
St Mary's Church was erected in 1888, as a West Townsville mass centre and school for the Catholic parish of Townsville. It is the second oldest Catholic church in North Queensland. The former St Mary's Convent is a c. 1880s residence acquired by the Catholic Church in 1917.

Early settlement in Townsville began in the mid-1860s at the mouth of Ross Creek, and along the beach front to the north, but later development was concentrated along the creek to the west. By the late 1880s, West Townsville was a well settled area, and catholics in this area lived a considerable distance from St Joseph's Church and School on The Strand (established in the 1870s). Fr William Mason Walsh, second parish priest of Townsville, made the decision to establish a church and school in West Townsville, acquiring the St Mary's Church site in 1887.

The West Townsville church was designed by Rooney Bros, who were the premier builders, and frequently also the designers, of vernacular architecture in Townsville and North Queensland during the latter part of the 19th century. Matthew and John Rooney and their families were strong supporters of the catholic church.

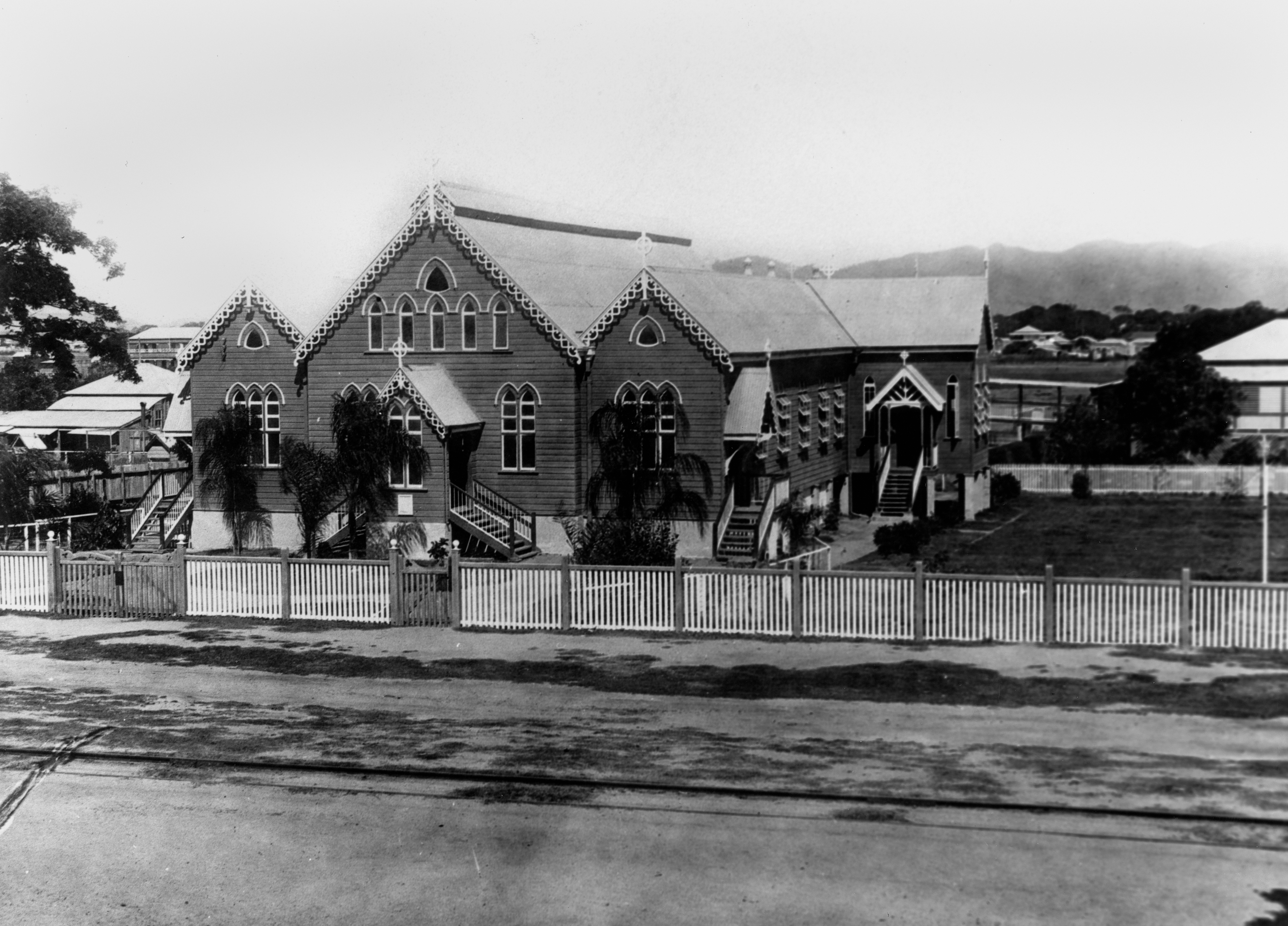

When St Mary's was erected by contractors Cowell & Holt in 1888, it was a simple rectangular structure with a nave and entrance porch. The present cedar pews in the nave date from this period. The sub-floor was enclosed to provide classroom space for the Sisters of Mercy, who opened St Mary's School there in the same year. The Sisters taught beneath the church until a new school building was erected on an adjacent block at the rear of the church in 1917.

The Sisters of Mercy, an Irish teaching and nursing order of catholic nuns, had arrived in Townsville in 1878, in response to a request from Fr Walsh. For ten years the Mercy nuns taught solely at St Joseph's on The Strand. From 1888 some of the nuns travelled by sulky to teach in the classrooms established under St Mary's Church at West End, and only took up residence near St Mary's when the parish of St Mary's was established in 1917. St Mary's was Townsville's second catholic parish, and comprised the suburbs now known as Mundingburra, Hyde Park, Belgian Gardens and Garbutt.

To accommodate the Sisters of Mercy within the new parish, the diocese purchased a timber residence in Castling Street, adjoining the church and school, early in 1917. The Castling Street residence is thought to have been constructed in the 1880s, but not on its present site. The original location is unknown, although it is likely to have come from one of the goldfields - probably Ravenswood or Charters Towers – to the west of Townsville. It was moved onto the site, possibly in 1897, when a mortgage for £130 was taken out on the property by the owner, Gustave Anderson, who had purchased the site at a Crown land sale held on 23 December 1890. Anderson died at his Castling Street residence in January 1898, but his widow remained resident in Castling Street for some years. In May 1901, she married Lauritz Henriksen Hoyer, and a Lawrence Hoyar is listed in Castling Street in the 1904 Queensland Post Office Directory. Mrs Hoyer had sold the property to the Pritchard family by 1912, and they in turn sold to the Catholic Church.

In 1917 the house, which was set on low stumps when acquired by the church, was raised on high wooden blocks, and the front southern room was extended into the front verandah to create a small chapel for the nuns. The front porch infill and rear extensions appear to date from this period also. Rooneys Ltd carried out the improvements, and St Mary's Convent was opened and blessed by Dr Joseph Shiel, Bishop of Rockhampton, on 12 August 1917. The sisters occupied this building until 1964, when it became the parish house for the priest. In 1975 the priest moved out and the house is now let.

Major alterations to the church were carried out in 1923 by Doig & Ritchie, under the supervision of Ardel Rooney of Rooneys Ltd. The building was widened to include transepts on either side of the main altar, side aisles and a sacristy. The marble altar, wooden side altars, baptismal font, altar rails, pulpit, pine pews in the aisles, and wood and plaster Stations of the Cross, date from this period. Also in 1923, cottage style gardens were constructed around the church. Their cement edgings were used in 1988 to recreate gardens for the centenary year. Some large fig trees, planted in 1923, still shade the lawns along Castling Street. The palms, African tulips, crepe myrtles and callistemons and various other shrubs and trees were planted in the 1980s.

The interiors of most catholic churches in Australia were modified as a result of changes in church thinking following Vatican II in 1963, but no alterations were made to St Mary's Church at West Townsville.

The school closed on 16 July 1997.

== Description ==
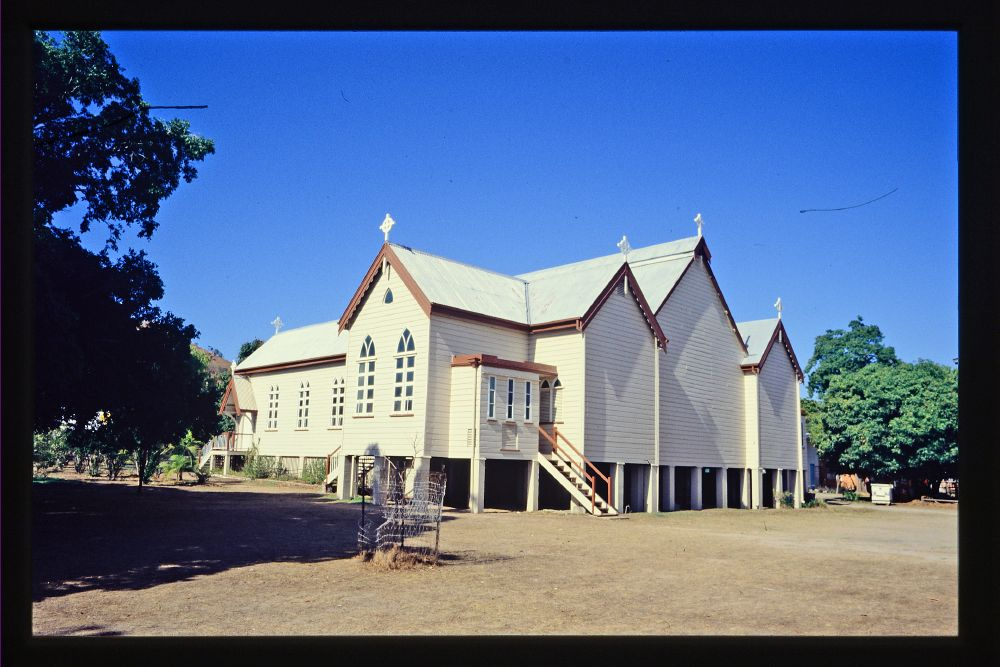
Rear view of St Mary's Church, 1994

=== The Church ===
St Mary's Catholic Church is a Gothic Revival influenced, single-storeyed chamferboard building with a triple gable corrugated iron roof and is supported by square concrete posts. The building is located on a level corner site fronting Ingham Road to the north, which is divided by the North Coast railway line, and is surrounded by associated buildings including the Presbytery, School, Parish Hall and the former St Mary's Convent, which is currently a rented dwelling.

The building has a T-shaped plan, with the nave facing north, a vestry to the west and confessionals to the east. The central, north entrance porch has twin timber stair and a gable roof. Gabled entrance porches are also located to the vestry and confessionals and the building has lancet hopper windows.

Internally, the building has exposed timber scissor trusses with a diagonally boarded ceiling and ventilated centre ridge. Timber columns support the central gable and divide the nave into three volumes. An organ and choir gallery is located over the north entrance and is partially cantilevered. The building has pointed arch doors, with the entrance doors having timber battened ventilation panels above and the walls are lined with plywood.

The building has an ornate grey marble altar and Calvary Arch, high quality plaster statues and carved timber pews, font and Stations of the Cross.

Evidence of the original extent of the church can be seen underneath with a masonry supporting wall. A steel support structure has been installed under the altar. The grounds include mature fig trees to the Castling Street boundary.

=== The former Convent ===
St Mary's (former) Convent, Townsville

General information
- Status: Private residence (c. 1880s–1914); Convent (1917–1964); Presbytery (1964–1975); Private residence (since 1975)
- Location: 15 Castling Street, West End, City of Townsville, Queensland
- Opened: 12 August 1917 (as a convent) by Dr Joseph Shiel, Bishop of Rockhampton
- Owner: Diocese of Townsville

Technical details
- Material: Timber; galvanised iron

The former Convent is a high-set single-storeyed timber building with a corrugated galvanised iron roof, situated at 15 Castling Street, West End, Townsville.

In form, the building comprises a six-roomed core under a hipped roof, with a gabled entry porch to Castling Street and an encircling verandah of lesser pitch that meets the walls below the eaves line. Although the house is large and spacious, its proximity to the Church and Hall, its surrounding garden, its low pitched roof and its enclosure by horizontal timber louvres, all diminish its visual scale.

The six central rooms are placed three to a side, each with a doorway to the central passage and french doors to the verandah. There is a kitchen, a bathroom and two sitting rooms in the rear enclosed verandah.

At the front of the house, the southeast room has been extended into the verandah and rebuilt as a chapel, with a Gothic pointed arch opening inserted into the west wall.

There are pointed arch ventilating openings to the internal doorways of the two front rooms, and ornamental crosses cut into the front porch panels.

The core walls are of exposed frame construction with horizontal chamferboards with curved rebates, fixed to the inside face of vertical studs, with one bracing member in the centre of each wall.

The house has pine floors throughout, nailed to joists on doubled bearers and supported on adzed round hardwood stumps; cover strips conceal the central cut along the passageway that is evidence of the house having been moved onto the site.

Verandahs have raked ceilings lined in pine, and are enclosed with painted timber louvres. Interior walls and ceilings are lined with painted pine boards, with wall linings to the passage side.

The area under the northern verandah has been built in to form a suite of rooms, with maps painted on the walls, illustrating their former function as school rooms.

== Heritage listing ==
St Mary's Church & Convent was listed on the Queensland Heritage Register on 2 January 1993 having satisfied the following criteria.

The place is important in demonstrating the evolution or pattern of Queensland's history.

St Mary's Church, erected in 1888 with 1923 additions, is important in demonstrating an aspect of the pattern of Queensland history, namely, the establishment and growth of the Catholic Church in North Queensland.

It also retains its c. 1880s layout and fabric, and is significant as an early, intact residence of substantial proportions in Townsville. It demonstrates part of the pattern and evolution of Queensland history, surviving as important physical evidence of the widespread removal, transportation and re-erection of timber buildings in Queensland in the 19th and early 20th centuries, and more precisely, of the large numbers of buildings removed from Ravenswood and Charters Towers to Townsville in this period.

The place is important in demonstrating the principal characteristics of a particular class of cultural places.

St Mary's Church remains substantially intact, and is important in demonstrating the principal characteristics of a simple, evolving timber church of the late 19th/early 20th centuries, in Townsville.

The place is important because of its aesthetic significance.

Through its scale, form and materials, St Mary's Church makes a significant contribution to the Ingham Road streetscape and Townsville townscape. The building is significant also for the quality and craftsmanship of the interior and fittings.

The place has a strong or special association with a particular community or cultural group for social, cultural or spiritual reasons.

St Mary's Church is the second oldest catholic church in North Queensland, and is significant for its strong and special association as a centre of catholic worship, education and community life in Townsville for over a century. St Mary's Church is significant also for its special association with St Mary's parish, created in 1917, as only the second catholic parish in Townsville. St Mary's Church is significant for its special association with the Rooney family and their important North Queensland building firms of Rooney Bros, Rooney & Co. and Rooneys Ltd.

The place has a special association with the life or work of a particular person, group or organisation of importance in Queensland's history.

The former St Mary's Convent is significant for its association with the contribution of the Sisters of Mercy to the educational and cultural life of West Townsville for nearly fifty years, and retains clear physical evidence of its function as a convent.
