= Rooney Brothers =

North Queensland architecture and construction business

Rooney Brothers was an architecture and constructions business operated by brothers John, Jacob and Matthew Rooney in Queensland, Australia. They dominated the North Queensland building industry until the early years of the 20th century.

== History ==
In the late 1860s, Irish immigrants John and Jacob Rooney had established a building and timber-milling business at Maryborough, where later they were joined by their brother Matthew. In the late 1870s John and Matthew established a branch of J & J Rooney, builders, at Townsville, which was developing as the port for the Ravenswood and Charters Towers goldfields. In 1882 John and Matthew established their own business interests at Townsville, setting up the firms of Rooney Bros (architects, builders and contractors) and, in partnership with James Harvey, the timber-milling enterprise of Rooney & Co. By the mid-1880s they were operating their own fleet of small vessels to bring timber from Maryborough and other Queensland ports to their mill and factory on Ross Creek.

By controlling every stage of the building process - logging, milling, prefabrication, design, construction, hardware supply, and later furniture manufacture and paint sales -and by adopting highly mechanised production techniques and large volume turnovers, Rooneys' dominated the North Queensland building industry until the early years of the 20th century.

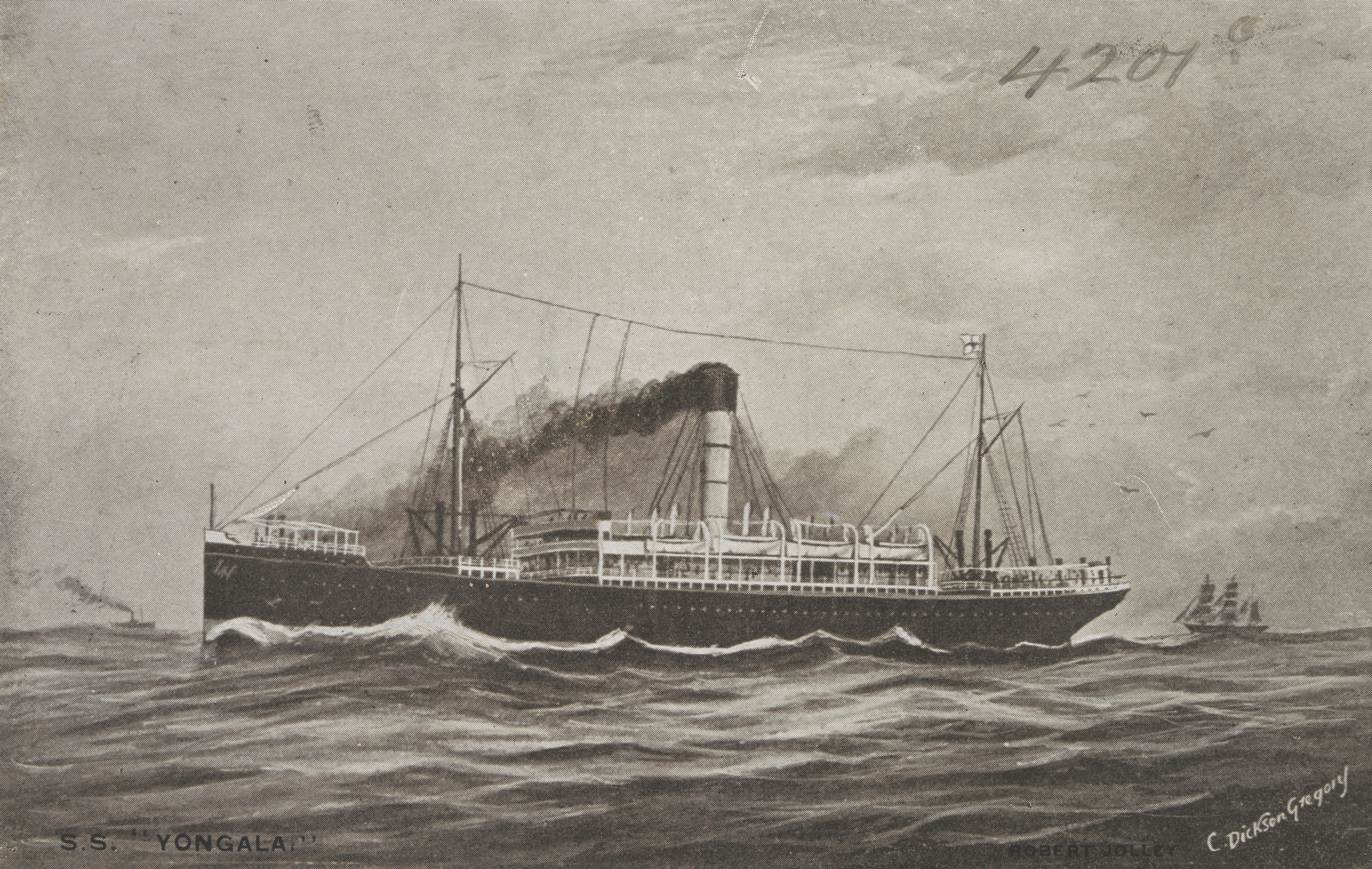
SS Yongala, 1906

Matthew Rooney was a prominent Townsville citizen, first chairman of the Townsville Harbour Board, 1896–97, and a strong supporter of the Catholic Church. On 23 March 1911 he, his wife and his youngest daughter were drowned in the wreck of the SS Yongala, south of Townsville. The Rooney firms were already losing their pre-eminence in the North Queensland building industry, and after Matthew's death, declined rapidly. The heirs reconstructed as Rooneys Limited, concentrating on building prefabrication initially, then furniture manufacture and retail trading, until winding up the firm in 1946.

== Significant works ==
- Yongala Lodge: Matthew Rooney's home in Fryer Street exhibits decorative finishes typical of a Rooney building - including the distinctive cast-iron balustrading and the remnant timber moulding of the lower verandah frieze - and was one of few two-storeyed, timber residences erected in Townsville before the turn-of-the-century.
- St Mary's Church & Convent, Townsville
