= West End Hotel, Townsville =

West End Hotel
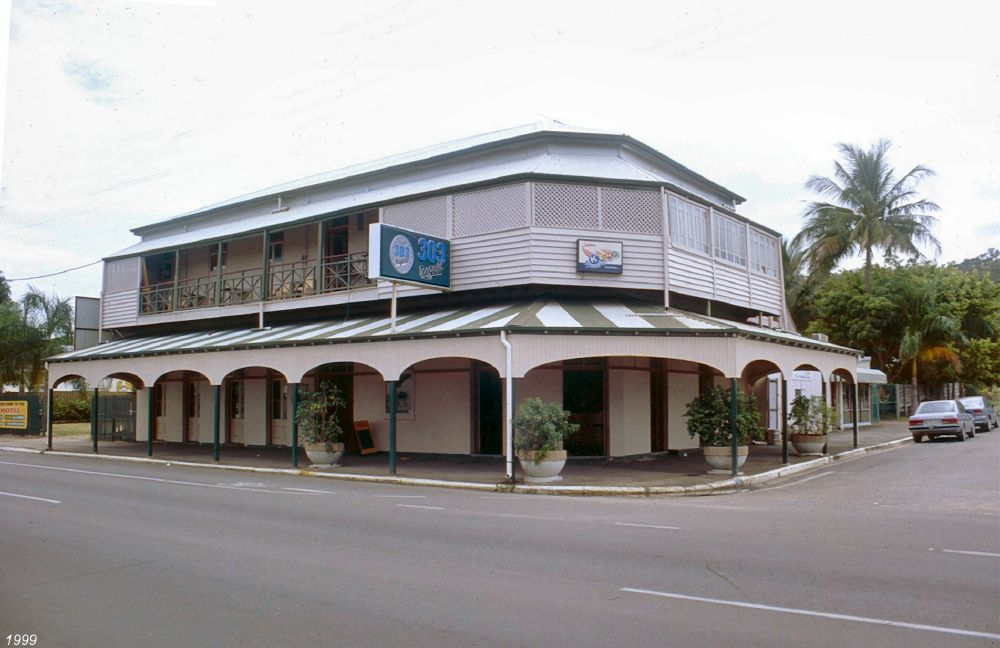
- West End Hotel, 1999

- Location within Queensland Location within Australia
- 19.2677°S 146.7985°E
- Location: 89 Ingham Road, West End, City of Townsville, Queensland, Australia

History
- Design period: 1870s–1890s (late 19th century)
- Built: 1885

Queensland Heritage Register
- Official name: West End Hotel
- Type: state heritage (built)
- Designated: 24 June 1999
- Reference no.: 601028
- Significant period: 1880s (fabric); 1885–ongoing (historical use)
- Significant components: kitchen/kitchen house
- Builders: Peter Dean

West End Hotel is a heritage-listed hotel at 89 Ingham Road, West End, City of Townsville, Queensland, Australia. It was built in 1885 by Peter Dean. It was added to the Queensland Heritage Register on 24 June 1999.

== History ==
West End Hotel was constructed in 1885 by Townsville builder Peter Dean, who was also the first licensee.

Early settlement in Townsville spread along the beach in the present North Ward area, with the commercial centre located along the bank of Ross Creek (Flinders Street). As the town developed, settlement spread further along Flinders Street to the area which became known as West End. By 1868 the West End Cemetery had been established in the area and by 1878 the Carriers Arms Hotel, a soap works, a foundry, commercial buildings and a large estate held by Frederick Ashton, were located at West End.

By the time West End Hotel was constructed in 1885, Townsville had grown to a thriving supply town for the pastoralists and miners in North Queensland. It had a port and was connected to Charters Towers and Hughenden by rail.

The West End Hotel was constructed in 1885 by Townsville builder and first licensee, Peter Dean. The hotel was built on Ingham Road opposite the Pastoral and Agricultural Society Showgrounds and close to the Racecourse. Located on the edge of the township, the hotel was on the road which led over Hervey's Range to the stations in the interior, a location which made it the first point of call for travellers arriving from the bush.

The two storeyed building was constructed of brick with a concrete floor throughout the ground level. On the ground floor there was a bar, three sitting rooms, a large dining room and a billiard room with a large, new table. Upstairs there was a large parlour, eight bedrooms and a bathroom. The timber balustraded balcony overlooked the showgrounds and the mountains to the south and west.

Special accommodation was provided at the rear for race horses. There were ten secure and well ventilated loose boxes as well as ordinary stabling for travellers' horses. The proximity of the hotel to the race track ensured that the accommodation was full during the racing season. By 1886 the showgrounds were in regular use for sports meetings and the hotel was the venue for the presentation of prizes in 1886. It was also the terminus for the West End Omnibus Line which travelled between Tattersalls Hotel, Flinders Street East and West End Hotel.

Townsville continued to expand with settlement spreading along the new, south western road to the goldfields at Ravenswood and Charters Towers. Commercial development along Charters Towers Road meant that West End was no longer a centre of business. Suburban development did not spread beyond West End until after World War II although the hotel continued to provide a service for travellers reaching town from the west and north west.

The hotel would have been very busy during WWII because of its location close to an Australian Construction Corp camp at West End Cemetery. Although there are still rooms for rent, the hotel does not cater for the travelling public any more. However, it has continued to be a well patronised hotel, particularly during Townsville Show Week.

The building has been damaged by three cyclones since it was constructed and, while it has been restored, some components have been changed or lost including recent changes to the profile of the street awning.

== Description ==
The building lies on the corner of Ingham Road and Jane Street. It comprises a 2-storey rectangular building with a splayed corner, constructed in brick with timber floors and a corrugated iron hipped roof. There is a detached single storey rectangular building to the rear (the kitchen) constructed in brick with a corrugated iron hipped roof. There are extensive modern mono-pitch extensions to the rear of the building which link to the detached kitchen block. The main building has a 2-storey timber verandah and awning to Ingham Road and Jane Street frontages, partly enclosed at first floor level with recent glazing and lattice work. It has a decorative timber balustrade of a "union jack" design. The awning has timber posts with a simple timber slat curved valance between each post which is a recent addition to the awning. The roofs of the verandah and awning are of corrugated iron. The brick work is laid in English bond. The original red bricks have been painted over.

The ground floor front elevation has an asymmetrical design with four original double timber and glazed casement doors with fanlights over to the west of the principal access door, and two modern solid timber doors with fanlights to the east. The splayed corner of the building has a modern timber door, while the side elevation to Jane Street has two modern solid timber doors with fanlights over. The west end elevation is of solid brick, while the rear elevation has three door openings and a window.

The first floor front elevation is also asymmetrical with four original timber and glazed casement doors with fanlights over to the west of the main public access door onto the verandah, and two original timber and glazed casement doors with fanlights over to the east. The enclosed side elevation was not inspected. Early photographs indicate a casement door in the splayed corner and two casement doors to the side. The west slide elevation has a single window, while the rear elevation has a door blocked door opening and six windows opening with modern louvre glazing.

The detached kitchen building has three door openings and a window to the south front elevation, and a substantial chimney to the west side elevation.

Internally the ground floor comprises a main access hall providing access to the staircase and rooms either side. To the west are two full depth rooms, linked by a large opening in the dividing wall, now used as pool rooms. To the east is a bar, with a comparatively modern u-shaped bar fitting. To the rear of the main building are a number of single storey mono-pitched rooms, comprising bar and kitchen accommodation, and toilets.

The timber staircase is of a simple design with a single run to a middle landing and a return run to the first floor landing. It has simple timber slat balusters. The first floor comprises the main access hall giving public access to the verandah, and until recently to a first floor rear extension (toilets) which has been demolished. To the west is a central corridor giving access to three bedrooms on either side. The doors are of timber with four panels. To the east is the residential quarters of the manager. This appears to have been formed by adapting the original four bedrooms off a central corridor. Two of the bedrooms and the corridor have been opened up to form a kitchen/lounge and while the others remain in use as bedrooms. The enclosed verandah was not inspected. The walls and ceilings have been covered over at a later date with sheeting and battens.

While there have clearly been changes, the overall form, design and interior layout of the building survives. It retains a majority of original timber and glazed casement doors to the ground and first floor, and other joinery details.

== Heritage listing ==
West End Hotel was listed on the Queensland Heritage Register on 24 June 1999 having satisfied the following criteria.

The place is important in demonstrating the evolution or pattern of Queensland's history.

Built in 1885, it demonstrates the town limits at that time, and its location has a strong association with the Showground and railway line. The building is important as a premises which has operated as an hotel since 1885 and as such has a strong association with the growth and expansion of Townsville.

The place demonstrates rare, uncommon or endangered aspects of Queensland's cultural heritage.

The building is important as a rare surviving example of an intact balconied hotel in North Queensland, very few hotels survive with their balconies intact and of these fewer survive with an intact 1880s balustrade.
