= John Fanning (footballer) =

Australian rules footballer

Personal information
- Full name: John V. Fanning
- Born: 5 September 1948 (age 78)
- Original team: St Bernard's CBC
- Height: 188 cm (6 ft 2 in)
- Weight: 80 kg (176 lb)
- Position: Follower

Playing career^{1}
Years	Club	Games (Goals)
1968–70	Essendon	6 (1)
- ^{1} Playing statistics correct to the end of 1970.

John Fanning (born 5 September 1948) is a former Australian rules footballer who played with Essendon in the Victorian Football League (VFL). Fanning's uncle, Fred, was a champion goalkicker with Melbourne and still holds the record for most goals in a single VFL/AFL match. With Essendon, Fanning won the under-19s best and fairest in 1967 and a reserves premiership in 1968.

After leaving the Bombers in June 1970, he played for Williamstown and Brunswick in the Victorian Football Association (VFA), winning a premiership in 1976 with the former. Fanning played 132 games and kick 94 goals for Williamstown up until the end of 1980, excepting 1971 due to study commitments and 1979 when he went to Brunswick for one season. He was first ruck in Williamstown's 1976 premiership side and the 1970 grand final team and won the Club best and fairest award in 1974. He was captain-coach of the team in the disastrous 1978 season. Fanning was selected as captain and first ruck in the Williamstown 1970's Team of the Decade and is a member of the Williamstown Hall of Fame.

Fanning finished his playing career with Strathmore in 1979.
