= Queensland Post Office Directory =

The Queensland Post Office Directory was a series of publications listing people and businesses in Queensland, Australia.

== History ==
These publications were produced from 1868 to 1949 on an annual basis to enable people in Queensland to be contacted. They were produced initially by the Queensland Post Office but later they were outsourced to a commercial publisher. They were discontinued because people preferred to use telephone directories once telephones became widely used. Like telephone directories, the Queensland Post Office directories usually had two main sections, listings of names (like the White Pages) and listings of businesses organised by category allowing larger entries for advertising (like the Yellow Pages). Listing in these directories was not free or compulsory, but the benefits of being able to be contacted meant most businesses and most heads of households (except the poorest) are listed.
