= John Fanning (writer) =

Irish novelist and writer

- Born: 3 April 1973 (age 53); Dublin
- Education: Critical and wreative Writing
- Occupation: Author
- Writing career
- Language: English
- Genre: Fictional prose

John Fanning (born 3 April 1973) is an Irish novelist and writer.

== Biography ==
Fanning was born in Dublin. He currently lives in France.

== Career ==
Fanning is the author of the novel Ezekiel.

The "warm-hearted book plays with the conventions of epic", its protagonist, Ezekiel Yusuf Moran, coming of age in Provence and becoming a resistant during WWII before journeying through postwar Europe for many years.

Fanning received a master's degree from University College Dublin in the early nineties, after a primary degree at Maynooth University.

== Bibliography ==
=== Novels ===
- Ezekiel (2018)
