= Patri =

Patri may refer to:

- a genus of spiders in the family Oonopidae, with the sole species Patri david
- Patri (footballer) (born 1977), Spanish footballer
- "Gloria Patri", a Christian hymn

== People with the surname ==
- Angelo Patri (1876–1965), Italian author
- Giacomo Patri (1898–1978), Italian artist
- Héctor Patri (born 1956), Argentine boxer
- Ramiro Fernández Patri (born 1974), Argentine politician
- Purnendu Patri (1931–1997), Bengali writer and film director

== People with the given name ==
- Patri Fidiel (1762–1824), Maltese Capuchin
- Patri Friedman (born 1976), American political theorist
- Patri Satish Kumar (born 1970), Indian Carnatic musician
- Patri J. Pugliese (1950–2007), American historian
- Patri Vergara (born 1955), Spanish physiology professor

== See also ==
- Pater (disambiguation)
