= Mater =

Mater is a formal Latin term for mother and may refer to:

== Places ==
- Mater, Belgium, a village near Oudenaarde

== Health care ==
=== Australia ===
- Mater Hospital, North Sydney, New South Wales
- Mater Group, Brisbane, Queensland
- Mater Health Services North Queensland, which incorporates:
  - Mater Hospital Pimlico, Townsville, Queensland
  - Mater Women's and Children's Hospital

=== UK and Ireland ===
- Mater Infirmorum Hospital, Belfast, Northern Ireland
- Mater Misericordiae University Hospital, Dublin, Ireland (the best-known hospital in Ireland that is referred to as the Mater)
- Mater Private Hospital, Dublin, Ireland

=== New Zealand ===
- Mater Misericordiae Hospital, Auckland, now Allevia Hospital Epsom

== Music ==
- Mater, an album by Vladimír Godár
- "Mater", a song by The Beat Fleet from Pistaccio Metallic, 2011

== Other uses ==
- Tow Mater, a character in the Cars franchise
- Mater, a major part of an astrolabe
- M.A.T.E.R., a football (soccer) club in Rome

== People ==
- Juris Māters (1845–1885), Latvian writer and journalist
- Rudy Mater (born 1980), French footballer

== See also ==
- Dura mater, the outermost layer of the meninges surrounding the brain and spinal cord in mammals
- Arachnoid mater, the middle layer of the meninges surrounding the brain and spinal cord in mammals
- Pia mater, the innermost layer of the meninges surrounding the brain and spinal cord in mammals
