= Fatima Adoum =

French actress

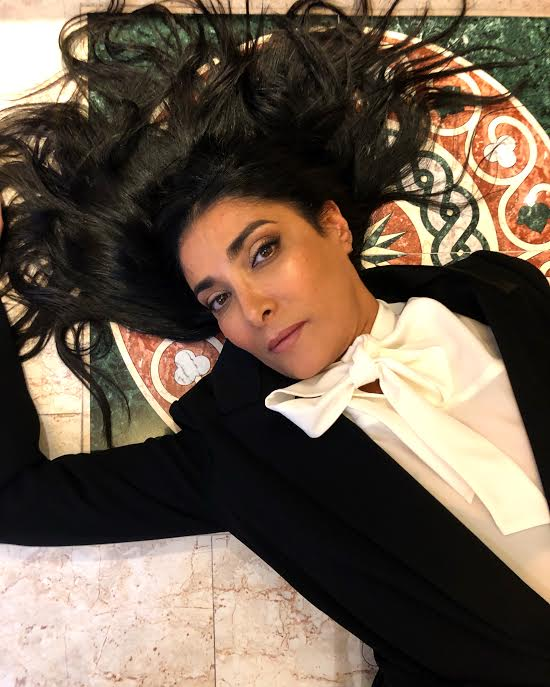

Fatima Adoum is a French actress.

== Biography ==
She studied language sciences, performing arts and holds a PhD in Cinema – at La Sorbonne, Paris 1.

== Filmography ==
=== Film ===
- 2002: Irréversible de Gaspar Noé
- 2002: Funeral, Newton I. Aduaka
- 2004: Les Anges malicieux, Frédéric Monpierre
- 2004: Wild Side, Sébastien Lifshitz
- 2005: Temps morts, Eléonore Weber
- 2008: La Louve, Bruno Bontzolakis
- 2009: Benicio, Eric Borg
- 2010: Infantania, Eric Borg
- 2010: One Man's Show, Newton I. Aduaka
- 2010: Stabat mater, Jean-Luc Herbulot
- 2010: À tout prix, Yann Danh
- 2010: Lili's Got Talent, Nur Sadiq
- 2011: L'Assaut Julien Leclercq
- 2011: Sherlock Holmes: A Game of Shadows, Guy Ritchie
- 2012: Judy and Jim, Ben Fellows
- 2012: A Place in the Sun, Peter Flinth
- 2013: Un p'tit gars de Ménilmontant, Alain Minier
- 2013: Munster cake, Jean-Luc Herbulot
- 2013: The Mark of the Angels – Miserere, Sylvain White
- 2013: Pastorale, Oriane Polack
- 2014: Les Trois Frères, le retour, Didier Bourdon et Bernard Campan
- 2015: Dealer, Jean-Luc Herbulot
- 2018: A Man in a Hurry, Hervé Mimran
- 2018: Taarof- (SF), Alannah Olivia
- 2018: Hope is French - (SF), Chris Mack
- 2019 : Irréversible, Inversion Intégrale, Gaspar Noé
- 2023 : Toi non plus tu n'as rien vu de Beatrice Pollet : Fanny
- 2023 : À fleur de peau de Christian Bonnet : Kasmi
- 2024 : Petites mains de Nessim Chikhaoui
- 2025 : Islands de Jan-Ole Gerster
- 2025 : 13 Days 13 Nights, In The hell Of Kabul de Martin Bourboulon

=== Television ===
- 2013: 15 jours ailleurs, Didier Bivel
- 2014: L'Hôtel de la plage, saison 1, Christian Merret-Palmair
- 2015: L'Hôtel de la plage, saison 2, Christian Merret-Palmair
- 2015: Cherif, saison 3, Akim Isker
- 2016: Falco, saison 4, Chris Briant
- 2016: Legends, Alrick Riley
- 2017: Vous les femmes, saison 5, Shaun Severi
- 2018: The Team season 2, Kasper Gaardsøe - Jannik Johansen
- 2018: On va s'aimer un peu, beaucoup..., Julien Zidi
- 2018: Illegals, Nielegalni, season 1, Jan P. Matuszynski
- 2019: Munch, saison 3, Laurent Tuel
- 2019: Les Bracelets rouges, saison 3, Jeremy Manguy
- 2020: Les Mystères de la chorale, Emmanuelle Dubergey
- 2021: Jack Ryan, Alik Sakharov
- 2021: Noël à tous les étages, Gilles Paquet-Brenner
- 2023–24: Hijack
- 2024 : Furies season 1, Cédric Nicolas-Troyan
- 2024 : 9.3 BB, Abd al Malik
- 2025 : Plaine orientale Pierre Leccia
- 2026 : Furies season 2, Cédric Nicolas-Troyan
- 2026 : The Interrogator, Stephen Fry
- 2026 : Mater, Keren Ben Rafael
- 2026 : House of David season 3, Jon Gunn

=== Theatre ===
- 2008: The Vagina Monologues Eve Ensler – Dominique Deschamps
- 2006: Theatre for animals Clément Labail
- 2006: Simply the best Clément Labail
- 1998: The Diary of Frida Kahlo Frida Kahlo – Franck Darras
- 1998: Andromaque Racine, – Franck Darras
- 1990: Le Pese-Nerfs Antonin Artaud, – Yvan Caillat

== Radio ==
- 2018: A Tale of two cities: Aleppo and London, BBC drama series, Polly Thomas
- 2018: Riot Girls: Into The Maze, BBC drama series, Emma Harding
- 2019: Oliver, BBC drama series, Ayeesha Menon – Michael Buffong
- 2020: French like Faiza, BBC 3, Nicolas Jackson
