= Dao Paratee =

Thai actor (1981–2010)

- ภารตี อัมพรรัตน์
- Dao in Lady Bar (2009)
- Born: Paratee Ampornrat; December 29, 1981; Bo Rai, Trat, Thailand
- Died: March 12, 2010 (aged 28); Bangkok, Thailand
- Occupation: Actress
- Years active: 2007–2010
- Known for: Lady Bar

Paratee Ampornrat (Thai: ภารตี อัมพรรัตน์; December 29, 1981 – March 12, 2010), known as Dao Paratee, was a Thai actress and model. She was known for her role as Pat in Xavier Durringer's 2007 French television film Lady Bar.

== Life and career ==
Paratee Ampornrat was born on December 29, 1981, in Bo Rai District, Trat Province. She started her career as a model to finance her university studies. She was featured on the covers of French magazines such as Les Inrockuptibles. She also appeared in commercial calendars and featured in Thai music videos such as "Oh No" by Thai rapper B-King.

In 2006, director Xavier Durringer cast Dao as the leading role, Pat, in the French television film Lady Bar with Éric Savin. It was premiered in Arte in 2007. The film became successful and had a 2009 sequel, Lady Bar 2, and starred in the independent international short film The Space Between Us alongside Kevin O'Beirne.

== Death ==
On March 12, 2010, Dao died in a car accident in Bangkok, at the age of 28. Her death was widely reported in European and Thai media news.
