= First Church of Christ, Scientist, Brisbane =

Heritage-listed church building in Brisbane, Queensland

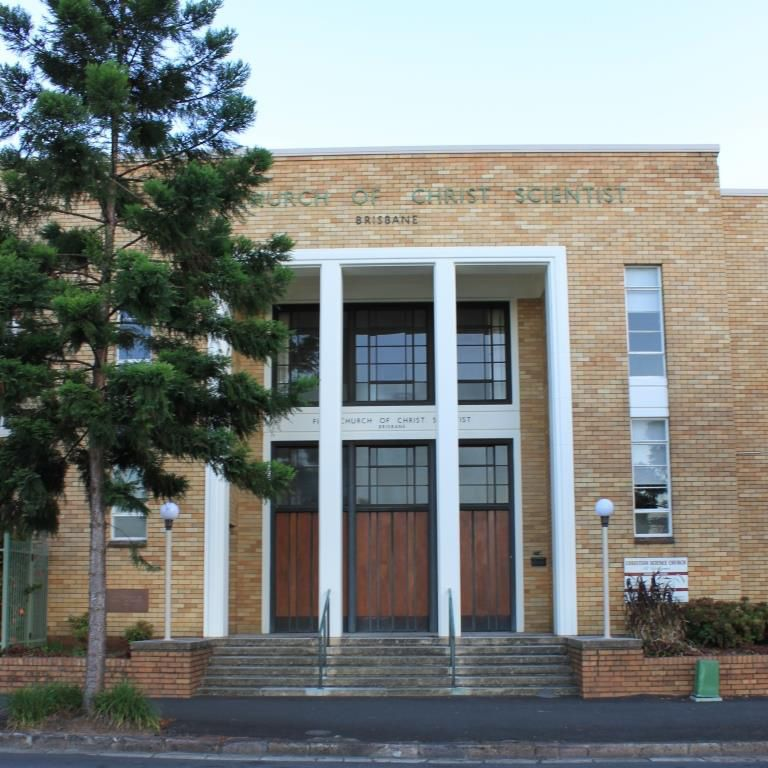
- First Church of Christ, Scientist, Brisbane, 2015

- Location within Queensland
- 27.4671°S 153.0169°E
- Location: 273 North Quay, Brisbane City, City of Brisbane, Queensland, Australia

Site notes
- Architect(s): Lucas and Cummings, Architects
- Architectural style: Modernist

Queensland Heritage Register
- Official name: First Church of Christ, Scientist, Brisbane
- Type: state heritage
- Designated: 11 March 2016
- Reference no.: 650017

First Church of Christ, Scientist, Brisbane is a heritage-listed site at 273 North Quay, Brisbane City, City of Brisbane, Queensland, Australia. It was designed by Lucas and Cummings, Architects. It was added to the Queensland Heritage Register on 11 March 2016.

== History ==
The First Church of Christ, Scientist, Brisbane (1940) is a two-storey masonry building located on the western end of North Quay in the Brisbane central business district (CBD). Erected as the result of the growth of the church in the first half of the 20th century, it continues to serve the needs of its congregation. Designed by noted Brisbane firm Lucas and Cummings, Architects, the building is an excellent, intact example of their work and of modernist design. In 1950, the church was awarded the "Medal for Meritorious Architecture for Institutional Buildings erected in Brisbane between 1940 and 1949" by the Queensland Chapter of the Royal Australian Institute of Architects (RAIA).

During the 19th century, North Quay, running along a ridge beside the Brisbane River from Victoria Bridge (Queen Street) to the River Road (known as Coronation Drive from 1937), was a mixed commercial and residential area including a number of elite houses. Along its course were the Supreme Court Building (between Adelaide and Ann Streets); commercial buildings (Smith's Building – later Longreach Hotel – on the corner of Queen Street and North Quay, 1877–78; Helidon Spa Co building, between Skew Street and Eagle Terrace, removed 1897; Rankin & Morrow Biscuit Factory, 1896); and villas, houses and "cottages", primarily on its western extent.

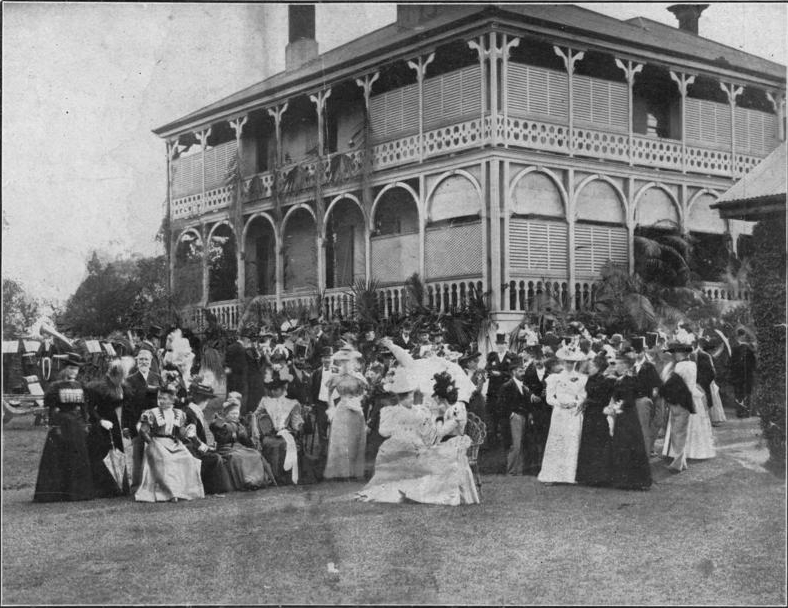
Wedding guests of Miss Perkins and Mr Randall McDonnell in the grounds of Aubigny, at North Quay, Brisbane, 1897

The area transitioned from predominantly residential use to government, commercial and institutional uses commencing around the turn of the century. Aubigny (originally Rosalie Villa, 259 North Quay) and William Douglas Grimes' house (269 North Quay) were leased by the Queensland Government 1900–1904, then were occupied by the first Mater Hospital 1906–10, and subsequently became Loretto Hostel for Catholic girls. Large residences such as Riversleigh and Davidson's House were converted into boarding houses; and new boarding houses were constructed. Later, houses were converted into flats. In the 1920s the construction of the Grey Street Bridge, a major river crossing into the CBD from West End, brought land resumptions and road changes to the western end of North Quay, to facilitate traffic flow on and off the bridge.

The interwar period was a time of enormous transformation of Brisbane's CBD despite economic downturn in the immediate post-World War I years and the Great Depression from 1929 into the 1930s. A building boom between 1922 and 1928 and a wave of building activity from the mid- to late 1930s created new landmark buildings, extended and remodelled existing premises and spread business houses and warehouses into residential areas.

The development of the North Quay site of the First Church of Christ, Scientist reflected this transformative trend, when, in 1939, two allotments on North Quay, both with substantial residences, were purchased for the site of its future church.

Christian Science is a Christian denomination which places a strong emphasis on the Bible's teachings for healing purposes. The Church of Christ, Scientist was founded in Boston, Massachusetts, United States of America in 1879 by influential American author, teacher and religious leader, Mary Baker Eddy, who is noted for her groundbreaking ideas about spirituality and health, which she named Christian Science.

The church has no clergy and each branch is self-governing and elects its own officers, but complies with the Church Manual of "The Mother Church" in Boston. An informal group of Christian Scientists can form into a Christian Science society or Church of Christ, Scientist, both of which are known as branches of The Mother Church. The society or church must comprise "at least 16 loyal Christian Scientists, four of whom are members of The Mother Church, and at least one member is a Christian Science practitioner" (listed in The Christian Science Journal).

Every Church of Christ, Scientist conducts Sunday services, testimony meetings, a Sunday School for pupils up to age 20, operates a reading room where information about Christian Science is available to the public, and organises lectures by Christian Science lecturers. Church services are conducted by two readers. These functions of the Church of Christ, Scientist determine the form of its church buildings.

Interest in Christian Science teachings started in several Australian colonies during the 1890s. The earliest recorded meetings began in Melbourne in June 1898 while several people met in the Brisbane home of Mrs Eliza Caroline Dutton before September 1899.

In February 1901, meetings were held in Mrs Helen Scott Byrne's home, Richmond Villa in Upper Roma Street, Brisbane; initially as a Christian Science organisation but soon afterwards as the Christian Science Society. Mrs Byrne's home became too small for services when attendees reached about 20, so the fledgling Society moved to the first floor of the Edwards Building in Adelaide Street at Petrie Bight, which could accommodate up to 100 people for services in its large room and had a smaller room for a reading room. In December 1901 the Christian Science Society formed itself into the First Church of Christ, Scientist, Brisbane with Mrs Byrne as the First Reader and Mr J H Granger as the Second Reader. Within less than a year, there were about 60 people attending services.

By 1909 the Petrie Bight location was inadequate, so the First Church of Christ, Scientist, Brisbane took over a floor in the Brisbane Permanent Building and Banking Co Ltd's premises at 139 Adelaide Street, between Edward and Albert Streets. In 1915, the Church of Christ, Scientist was incorporated under the Religious, Education and Charitable Institutions Act, 1861 in Queensland.

In 1917, the church purchased a block of land at the corner of North Quay and Tank Street for a church building designed by Thomas Wightman. The cornerstone of the First Church of Christ Scientist, Brisbane building was laid and stage one of the 300-seat building erected later that year.

Throughout the 1920s the Christian Science movement expanded, with new branches and bigger churches opening, especially in suburban Brisbane, Sydney and Melbourne, as well as new groups meeting outside capital cities.

By 1930 the First Church of Christ, Scientist, Brisbane had outgrown its North Quay building, so Centennial Hall at 104 Adelaide Street was purchased for £16,500 and converted to accommodate 1000 people for services, while the Sunday School was held in a nearby cafe.

Due to growth of the Christian Science movement in Brisbane, the Second Church of Christ, Scientist, Brisbane formed, centred on the suburb of Clayfield. It built a church building in 1938 at Vine Street, Clayfield. This modernist building was designed by Robert Percy Cummings to suit the triangular site and to meet the particular spatial needs of the congregation.

By the late 1930s the First Church of Christ, Scientist, Brisbane again needed a larger church for its purposes. It purchased two allotments on North Quay to the west of its earlier site in c. 1939 (the Grimes' house, which was part of Loretto Hostel) and in March 1939 (Crossen-an-Oder). By April 1939 the house on the Loretto site was sold at public auction for removal.

The planning and architectural expression of Christian Science church edifices has been the subject of considerable discourse since the Mother Church in Boston was completed in the mid-1890s. Autonomy in the choice of architectural design and the departure from long accepted church types was supported by the Christian Science movement from the outset. In its formative years, and in contrast to orthodox churches, the Church of Christ Scientist adopted a Neo-Classical expression. By the early 20th century, Christian Science churches were increasingly inventive and eclectic. Excellence in design and construction and the use of high quality materials were common to all. Increasingly the principles of Modernism were adopted to create distinctive places of worship where the architectural form developed from the planning and practical requirements of the Church.

Early examples of this evolution in design include the 1910 First Church in Berkeley, California designed by renowned architect Bernard Maybeck. Other outstanding examples, in the UK and Europe, include the First Church (1903) in Manchester England, an Arts and Crafts design by Edgar Wood; the First Church in The Hague, a modernist design by Hendrik Berlage (1925); Salvisberg's First Church (1936) in Basel, and Hans Hofmann's First Church (1938) in Zurich.

The development of Christian Science church architecture in Australia closely mirrored its overseas counterparts. Eminent architects were selected to produce high quality buildings with characteristic operational and functional features. In the first two decades of the 20th century, Neo-Classical designs were preferred. Melbourne's First Church in St Kilda, designed in 1914 by Harold Dumsday of Bates, Peebles and Smart, and completed in 1922, has a temple-like form, Greek Revival elements and Byzantine influences. Sydney's First Church, opened in 1927 in Darlinghurst, was built in a Beaux Art style and is a major work by Samuel George Thorp, one of the founding partners of Peddle Thorp Walker.

By the 1930s, a Modern aesthetic was being adopted in response to a growing global interest in Modernism, a movement in architecture that emerged in Europe in the 1920s. Modernism embraced the ideals of Functionalism, new technologies and the rejection of ornament in an endeavour to create new and appropriate architectural solutions that reflected the social conditions of the time. Characteristics of the architecture these ideas produced included asymmetrical massing, simple geometric shapes, clean lines, steel-framed corner and strip windows, undecorated brick walls, flat cantilevered concrete awnings and low-pitched or flat roofs concealed behind parapets. One of the first examples of modernist architecture in Queensland was the Masel Residence in Stanthorpe, designed by Charles Fulton in 1936. It received wide publicity and architectural acclaim and introduced many features of this new and influential architectural vocabulary to Queensland. Modern architecture symbolised progress, innovation, efficiency and economy, qualities that made it appealing in the post-depression era.

Bates Smart McCutcheon designed the 1937 Moderne-Classical Second Church of Christ Scientist in Camberwell, which is strikingly similar to the First Church of Christ, Scientist, Brisbane. In Perth, the First Church of Christ Scientist, an Art Deco building, was designed by the well-known architectural firm Ochiltree and Hargrave and is one of the most notable public buildings in Western Australia from the interwar period. In Adelaide, foundations were laid in 1916 for their First Church designed by Woods, Laybourne Smith architects, but this building was not completed until 1957.

As the wide-ranging architectural expression of the Christian Science movement developed around the globe, there were operational and performance characteristics common to all, with several marked departures from the planning of orthodox churches and cathedrals. To allow all members of the congregation to hear the sermon and see the rostrum, a broader nave with much narrower aisles became necessary. Domes that interfered with acoustics were phased out; and a much larger foyer for congregating after services was required.

The buildings, no matter how their exteriors were expressed, were functional and innovative, and adopted advanced acoustics, lighting and state of the art ventilation systems. A stately appearance was important and entrances porches were frequently made of fine materials such as marble or terracotta with three or five entrance doors. Interiors were skilfully composed, efficient, restful, and well-lit. The substitution of established ecclesiastical symbols with plants and flowers added to the creation of a comfortable environment.

Good acoustics were paramount, as auditoriums were for listening and speaking, and contributed to the comfort of service attendees. Churches also needed to be well insulated from outside noise and shaped to complement this aspect of services. A large portion of the Sunday services consisted of reading from a dual pulpit in fixed positions, another aspect that church designers had to take into consideration. Sunday School involved opening and closing exercises, with the Sunday School superintendent standing on a raised platform followed by instruction given in rooms or alcoves around the perimeter, and reassembly in the centre of the main room at the end of the teaching period.

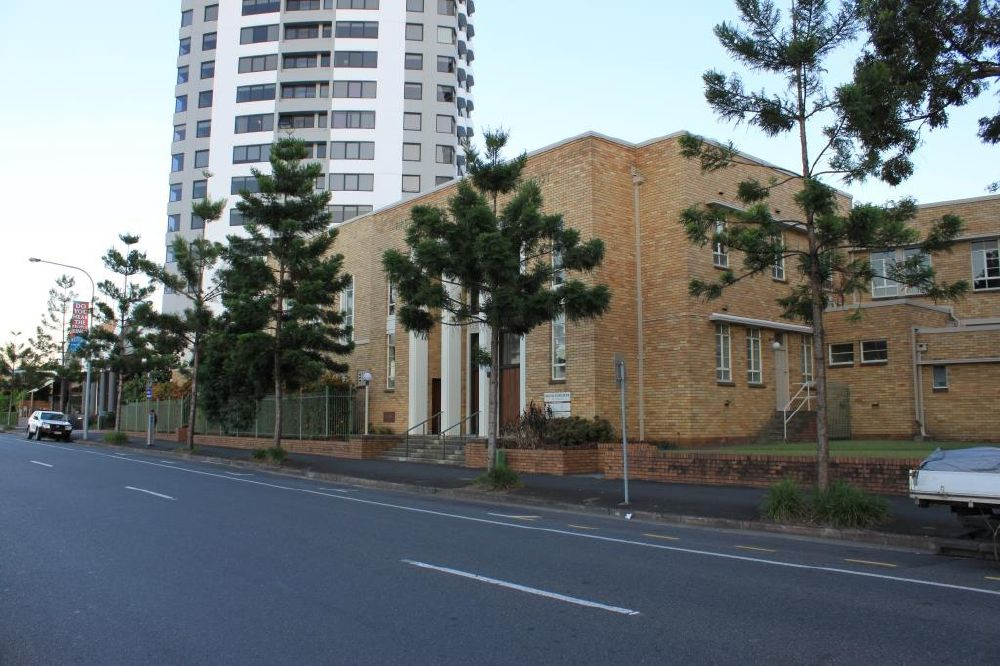
Church seen from North Quay, 2015

The First Church of Christ, Scientist, Brisbane in its current location on North Quay opened on 4 August 1940 with three special services during the day. The cost of the building was about £20,000. At this time it was described as follows:

A site of unusual shape has dictated the unorthodox plan adopted by the architects (Messrs FB Lucas and RP Cummings) in order to provide for the main activities of the church organisation. The imposing entrance from North Quay opens onto the main foyer from which all important sections of the building as accessible.

The church auditorium is entered from one side of the foyer. A fan-shaped auditorium has been used for three reasons. Firstly, it provides good acoustical conditions and assists in the uniform distribution of sound. Secondly, it gives...[a] seating arrangement suitable for testimony meetings and lastly it fits well on the unusual site. Readers' rooms etc are situated beyond the platform end of the auditorium and have a separate entrance from the side of the church. They are connected to the main entrance by a corridor along the side of the auditorium The corridor also acts as a sound shield to the main body of the building.

At the end of the foyer, opposite the main entrance is a small suite of rooms for men ushers and [the] Love Committee (relief). Also a secondary entrance and ramp from May Street at the rear of the site. A large cloakroom with a broad counter is served directly from the main foyer.

The Sunday School is placed on the opposite side of the main foyer to the auditorium, mainly in order to avoid any possibility of interference by sound transmission from one area to the other during services. It may be entered from the main foyer but the principal entrance is from outside, close to the main church entrance. Individual class rooms, superintendents and other rooms open off the Sunday School room. Entry [is] from the main foyer to a stair hall giving access the ladies' room, administrative entrance, literature counter and a small rest room.

The staircase ascends to suite of committee rooms, literature distribution room and the caretaker's flat, all over the Sunday School; and to the administrative section comprising boardroom, clerk's room and treasurer's room over the main entrance to the building.

A dignified exterior relies for its effect on the well-proportioned main masses of the building and suitable treatment of detail. Walls are finished in cream brick and the main entrance emphasised by a colonnade treatment in artificial stone.

Internally a feeling of space and restfulness is gained by handling of large surfaces of colour in light tones. The auditorium walls are panelled eight feet high with [solid vertical boards] of silver silkwood. The timber pews of special design are in similar material.

The auditorium is ventilated by a forced draught system of filtered air.... diffused artificial lighting is employed in the auditorium

The pipe organ ... built by B. B. Whitehouse and Co. Ltd [local organ-makers], is housed above the readers' platform behind a wide grille, while the console is to the side of the platform in a well, out of sight of the congregation.

Queensland timbers and materials are featured.... [Most] materials and labour are of Queensland origin.

The new building also incorporated the cornerstone of the First Church of Christ, Scientist, Brisbane's earlier church on the corner of Tank Street and North Quay.

Architects Frederick Bruce Lucas and Robert Percy Cummings were key figures in architecture in Queensland before and after World War II and had an affinity with the Modern movement. Their works were characterised by meticulous detailing and thoroughness in execution. These characteristics made them well-suited to be the architects for the First Church of Christ, Scientist, Brisbane. Cummings had previously designed the Second Church of Christ, Scientist at Clayfield, a commission he may have received due to connections to Christian Science through his mother-in-law. For the First Church of Christ, Scientist, Brisbane commission, Cummings was responsible for the design and Lucas was responsible for the working drawings and contract documents. Cummings' architectural training at the Architectural Association in London and subsequent travels provided him with the opportunity to study the work of European architects such as the Scandinavians and Dutch. He had a particular interest in and affinity with the work of Dutch modernist architect Willem Dudok.

Lucas and Cummings made a significant contribution to the architectural profession, devoting a major part of their careers to its advancement through architectural education (notably as foundation staff of the Faculty of Architecture at the University of Queensland); as office bearers in the Royal Australian Institute of Architects; and to increasing public awareness of architecture, urban design and art in Queensland. Brought into close contact through this work they set up practice in 1936. Despite limited opportunities to practice architecture in the 1930s-40s due to the Great Depression, World War II and post-war shortages, Lucas and Cummings produced a number of innovative projects. Individually and as partners they designed a small number of important buildings, some of which received awards for excellence in design and which were influential in the development of the post-war vernacular in Queensland.

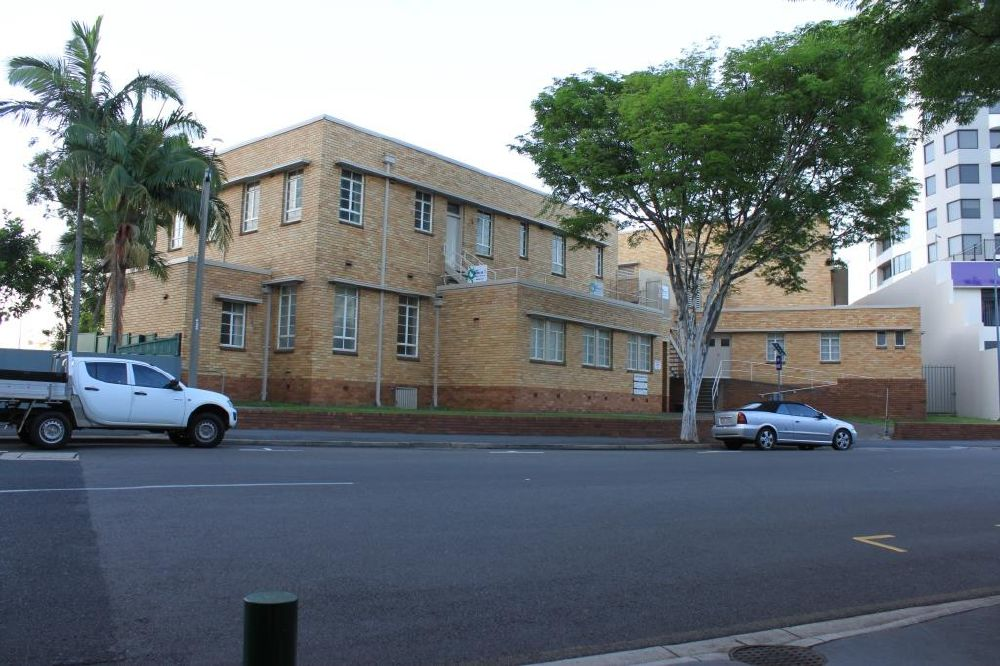
View of the back of the church from May Street, 2015

In 1950 the First Church of Christ, Scientist, Brisbane was awarded the "Medal for Meritorious Architecture for Institutional Buildings erected in Brisbane between 1940 and 1949", by the council of the Queensland Chapter of the RAIA. Since then, the building has been identified as being of cultural heritage significance by the study entitled "Significant 20th Century Architecture, Queensland" in 1988; was entered in the Brisbane City Council Heritage Register; and in 2010 was included in a draft list of nationally significant places formulated by an Australian Institute of Architects National Heritage Taskforce. It is also included in the Australian Heritage Places Inventory. In 2010 and 2011, the First Church of Christ, Scientist, Brisbane participated in the Brisbane Open House event.

The building is notably intact, a testament to its skilful design and execution and meticulous attention to detail. Only minor changes have been implemented in over 70 years of use as a Christian Science church. On the ground floor, the former cloak room has been adapted as a children's nursery; the book room/reading room is now used as the clerk's office; and the rooflight in the main foyer is now artificially lit. On the first floor, the caretaker's accommodation is no longer used for its original purpose, but for storage. The roof sheeting has been replaced and toilet suites on the ground floor have been upgraded. Glazing in many of the south-facing windows, damaged in a 2014 storm, has been replaced. Artificial stone cladding to the entrance columns has been painted.

In 2016, the First Church of Christ, Scientist, Brisbane remains the largest Christian Science church in Queensland. The building continues to fulfil its purpose of providing a place of worship by Christian Scientists where Christian Science services, testimonials, Sunday School classes and lectures continue to be conducted.

== Description ==
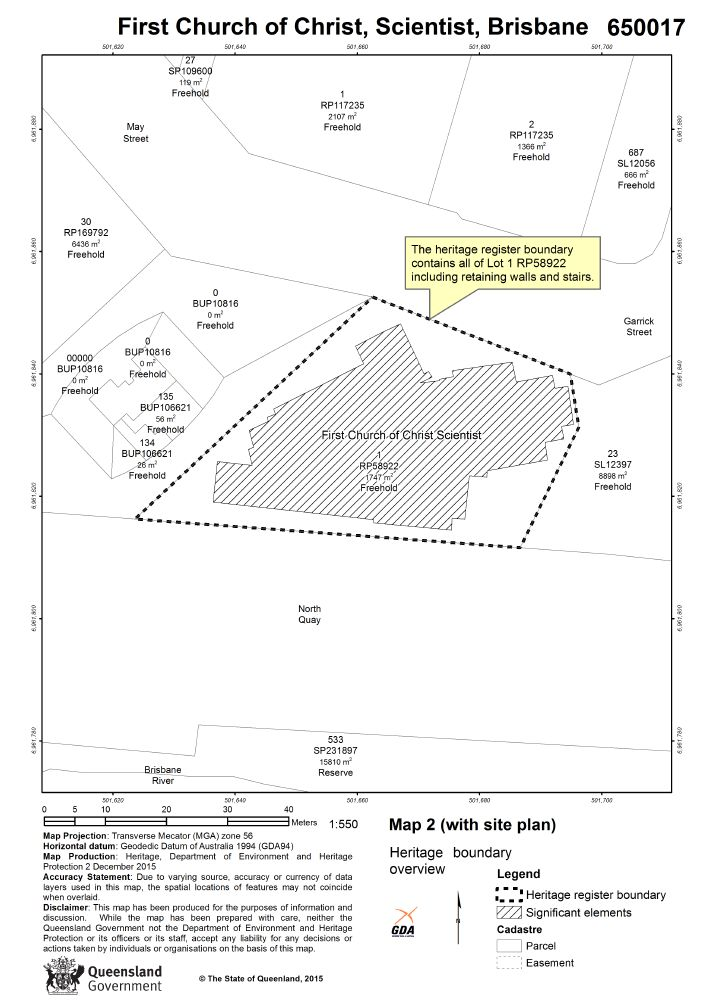
Site map, 2016

Approached from North Quay with secondary access from May Street, the First Church of Christ, Scientist, Brisbane is located at the western end of Brisbane's central business district overlooking the Brisbane River between the William Jolly Bridge and the Kurilpa Bridge. Its careful composition of simple, cubic volumes of one and two storeys, enveloped in buff-coloured brickwork with concrete parapets and continuous window hoods derives from its unconventional floor plan, which fits inside the boundaries of its irregular shaped allotment. The boundaries are defined by low brick retaining walls. In response both to its siting on a busy thoroughfare and to the introspective nature required of its interior, its limited fenestration to North Quay gives the building an introverted appearance. The building's intactness is testament to the exceptional quality of its design and execution.

Elevated from North Quay and accessed by a short flight of wide stairs, the main entrance to the Church is a simple triple-fronted portico lined with artificial stone. Through three pairs of tall timber entrance doors set within a bronze frame with banks of fanlights above, another short flight of stairs leads to the foyer, from which are accessible the auditorium to the west and the Sunday School, former book room and rest room (now the clerk's office), former cloak room (now a children's nursery), rooms for ladies' ushers and the stair hall to the east. The secondary entrance with ramp from May Street, together with rooms for male ushers are located at the opposite end of the foyer to the main entrance. An office (former clerk's office), boardroom, committee rooms and a self-contained flat are located on the first floor.

=== Auditorium ===
The building's principal space, the auditorium, is restrained, elegantly proportioned and light-filled. A large volume, it has symmetrically arranged tall, high level windows set in lightly coloured, rendered walls above a perimeter wall lining of 2.4-metre (7 ft 10 in) Queensland Maple panels. Devoid of applied decoration, its beauty is derived from its pleasing proportions and the high quality and finish of its materials, fixings and fixtures. Its fan-shaped plan and sloping floor direct focus to the readers' platform at the front of the room, and together with acoustic panels located on the rear wall, aid acoustics. The elevated readers' platform has dual pulpits and, in metal relief lettering, high on the walls to each side, are brief biblical quotations. An attachable additional platform, used for meetings, is located in the underfloor area. To the north (right) of the platform, the Whitehouse Brothers organ is located in an organ pit, the rear of which is accessible from an organ room to the west, which has external access for ease of maintenance. The organ pipework is concealed behind the perforated screen above the readers' platform. Auditorium seating comprises five banks of pews separated by narrow side, centre and transverse aisles; each pew graduating in length in response to the irregular floor plan.

An inventive feature that is in working order is the mechanical ventilation system. Timber registers, located within the timber wall panels and carefully centred under each of the windows, draw air up through the walls from the plenum system located in the basement, which is then expelled through the ventilated ceiling beams and louvres in the eastern wall.

Beyond the readers' platform is a secondary entrance from North Quay for readers, readers' rooms and rooms for the soloist, organist, flowers and ancillary facilities. A passage running the length of the auditorium between the main and readers' entrances provide an effective acoustic buffer from North Quay.

=== Sunday School ===
Located on the eastern side of the foyer and accessible from it, is the Sunday School. Its main entrance is centred in the southern wall, accessible along a short path from North Quay. The Sunday School has a generously proportioned hall with three classrooms on the northern side, girls' and boys' toilets on the southern side, either side of the entrance and a platform for the superintendent on the eastern end. Behind this platform are the superintendent's room and the library.

=== First Floor ===
The stair hall leads to the first floor where are located a suite of committee and literature distribution rooms and the caretaker's flat located above the Sunday School. An administrative area, located above the main entrance and foyer, contains the boardroom, clerk's room and treasurer's room.

=== Details ===
All architectural details are well finished and include steel framed windows and balustrades; terrazzo window sills, toilet partitions and floors in the entrance lobby, stairs, stair hall and bathrooms. Original fittings, fixtures, furniture and signage are retained throughout the building. Internal walls throughout are rendered and painted in a limited palette of light colours.

== Heritage listing ==
First Church of Christ, Scientist, Brisbane was listed on the Queensland Heritage Register on 11 March 2016 having satisfied the following criteria.

The place is important in demonstrating the evolution or pattern of Queensland's history.

The First Church of Christ, Scientist, Brisbane (1940) is important in demonstrating the development of the Christian Science church in Queensland during the 20th century. Built during a period of significant growth of the Christian Science denomination in Queensland, it is both representative of that growth and a distinctive example of a Christian Science church.

The First Church of Christ, Scientist, Brisbane is an important building in the evolution of architecture in Queensland. Designed by Lucas and Cummings Architects, leaders in all aspects of the architectural profession in Queensland in the first half of the 20th century, it demonstrates the influence of modernist architectural ideas and practices that developed initially in Europe and became the dominant trend in architecture from the mid-twentieth century.

The place is important in demonstrating the principal characteristics of a particular class of cultural places.

The First Church of Christ Scientist, Brisbane, is important in demonstrating the principal stylistic and operational characteristics of a Christian Science church from the early 20th century. It features: a stately exterior, and contrasting light and comfortable interior; a portico embellished with a fine finish; an entrance comprising three doors; a large foyer to foster sociability; dual access to a light, airy auditorium designed to maximise acoustics; mechanical ventilation and employed the latest available technology. The building has a Sunday School and offices for church business and the whole is devoid of ecclesiastical symbols.

The First Church of Christ Scientist, Brisbane, exhibits a high degree of intactness and integrity which make it exceptional in illustrating the key attributes of a Modernist building in Queensland. The skilful organisation of its cubic massing determined by practical demands is clearly articulated through the asymmetrical composition, simple geometric shapes and clean lines of its external form. Steel framed windows, undecorated brick walls, flat cantilevered concrete awnings and low pitched roofs concealed behind parapets, contribute to this aesthetic.

The place is important because of its aesthetic significance.

The First Church of Christ Scientist, Brisbane, features a modern design with modernist architectural qualities. Its features include abstract monumental elevations, rectangular and cubic massing, asymmetrical composition, simplicity and clarity of form, and an emphasis on horizontal lines. The design incorporates decorative restraint in its external and internal forms, furniture, fittings, and detailing, utilizing quality materials and construction.

The place is important in demonstrating a high degree of creative or technical achievement at a particular period.

The First Church of Christ, Scientist, Brisbane demonstrates a high degree of creative achievement through its architectural excellence and exceptionality. In 1950, Lucas and Cummings Architects received the "Medal for Meritorious Architecture for Institutional Buildings erected in Brisbane between 1940 and 1949" from the Queensland Chapter of the Royal Australian Institute of Architects for this building. Its creative achievement continues to be recognised by the architectural profession.

The place has a strong or special association with a particular community or cultural group for social, cultural or spiritual reasons.

The First Church of Christ, Scientist, Brisbane has a strong association with the Christian Science church in Queensland. Since 1940, the church building has served as a place of worship, teaching and meeting, for the largest congregation of the Christian Science church in the state.
