= Pater =

Pater may refer to:

== Latin for "father" ==
- a title given to a father deity
  - Dis Pater, a Roman and Celtic god of the underworld, later subsumed by Pluto or Jupiter
  - God the Father in Christianity
- a title or honorific applied to a male community leader
  - a honorific for ordained Catholic priests
  - Pater familias
  - Pater Patriae
  - Pater, the leader of a Mithraeum in Mithraism

== People with the surname ==
- Grzegorz Pater (born 1974), Polish soccer player
- Jean-Baptiste Pater (1695–1736), French painter
- Walter Pater (1839–1893), English essayist, critic and humanist

== Popular culture ==
- Pater (film), a 2011 French film
- Pater Moeskroen, Dutch Folkband
- Stade Pater Te Hono Nui, a stadium/sports complex in Pirae, Tahiti

== Other uses ==
- Pastil, a Filipino packed rice dish

== See also ==
- Pater noster
- Patriarch
- Patriarchy
- Mater (disambiguation)
