= Hôtel de la plage =

- Created by: Lorene Delannoy; Fabienne Lesieur
- Starring: Bruno Solo; Jonathan Zaccaï; Yvon Back
- Country of origin: France
- No. of seasons: 2
- No. of episodes: 12

Production
- Cinematography: Marc Koninckx
- Running time: 52 minutes

Original release
- Network: France 2 (France)
- Release: July 16, 2014 – June 3, 2015

Hôtel de la plage is a French-language television series. It has been distributed from 2014 to 2015 on France 2 (France). The network decided to end the show after season 2.

== Plot ==
At Ronce-les-Bains, a resort in the southwest of France, five families meet every year at the Hôtel de la plage (beach hotel) for a long-awaited summer break, away from everyday life. But nothing goes as planned.

== Cast ==
- Bruno Solo : Paul Lopez
- Jonathan Zaccaï : Martin Guignard
- Yvon Back : Victor
- Annick Blancheteau : Yvonne
- Sophie-Charlotte Husson : Isabelle
- Fatima Adoum : Samia Lopez
- Arnaud Henriet : Yann
- Olivia Côte : Marine
- Karina Testa : Sophie
- Pascal Elso: Jeff
- Philippe Hérisson : Jeff
- Xavier Robic : Benjamin
- Nassim Si Ahmed : Omar
- Farida Ouchani : Aïcha
- Méliane Marcaggi : Morgane
- Margaux Rossi : Fanny
- Gaïa Berthomme : Elsa
- Adam Neil : Kevin
- Manon Giraud-Balasuriya : Manon
- Gilles Mercier : Tom
- Valérie Dashwood : Stéphanie
- Alexandre Tacchino : Julien
- Olivia Gallay : Nina
- Joël Pyrene : Roger
- Elie Tertois : Ludo
- Juliet Lemonnier : Carla
- Mireille Perrier : Rose

=== Guest ===
- Luce : Herself (Episode 2, Season 2)
- Françoise Lépine : Océane (Episode 6, Season 2)
