= Aubigny, North Quay =

Historic house in Brisbane, Queensland

Coordinates: 27.4670°S 153.0168°E

Aubigny (later called Loretto) was a house located at 273 North Quay, Brisbane, Queensland, Australia. It is associated with many significant aspects of Brisbane's history.

== Brisbane's first synagogue ==
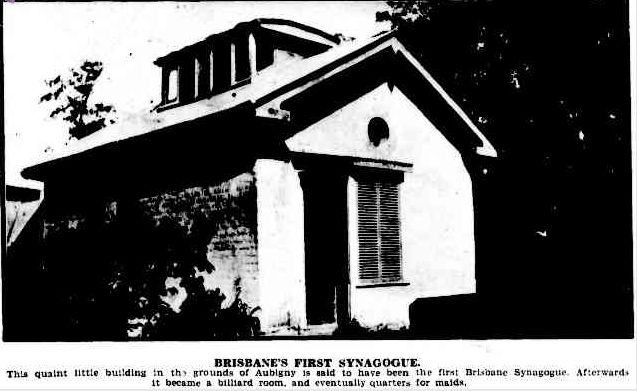
Brisbane's First Synagogue in the grounds of Aubigny, North Quay

The house was originally built in 1870 by Samuel Davis, a Jewish businessman, and included a separate building used as Brisbane's first synagogue.

== Society mansion ==
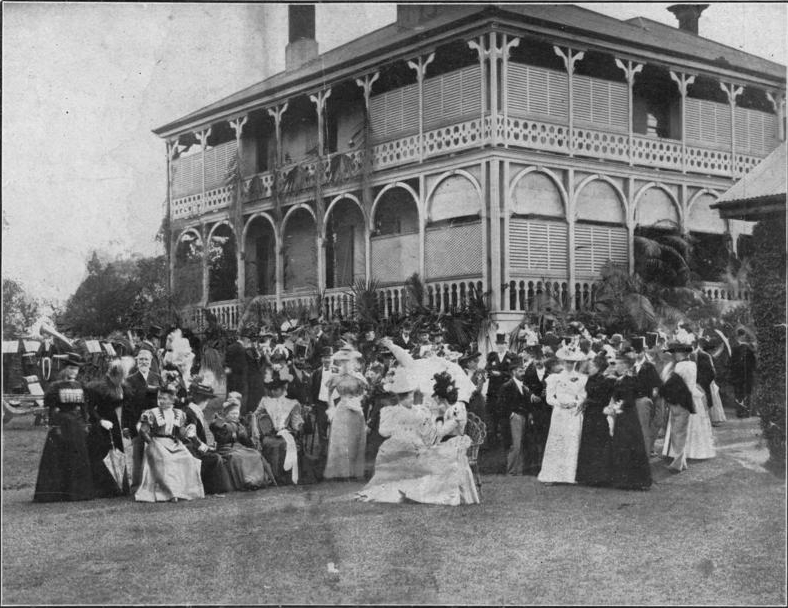
Aubigny, at North Quay, Brisbane, 1897, when Miss Lilly Perkins married Mr Randal McDonnell

In 1883 Patrick Perkins, brewer and politician, used his wealth to buy the palatial home, which he called "Aubigny" after the electoral district of Aubigny that first elected him to the Queensland Legislative Assembly. Patrick Perkins used the former synagogue as a billiards room.

== Police facility ==
In 1899, the Perkins family rented the property to the Criminal Investigation Department which used the house as offices and the synagogue as a photography room.

== The first Mater hospital ==
In late 1905 after the death of Perkins, the house was sold to the Rev. Mother Patrick of the Sisters of Mercy to create the 20-bed Mater Misericordiae Hospital (now a tertiary hospital located at South Brisbane); the former synagogue being the hospital chapel. Eventually, the hospital outgrew the house and relocated to the South Brisbane area where it still operates.

== Loretto, girls hostel ==
In 1913, the Sisters of Mercy then renamed the house "Loretto" and used it as a hostel for respectable Catholic girls coming from the country to work in Brisbane; the former synagogue being the maids' quarters.

== Resumption ==
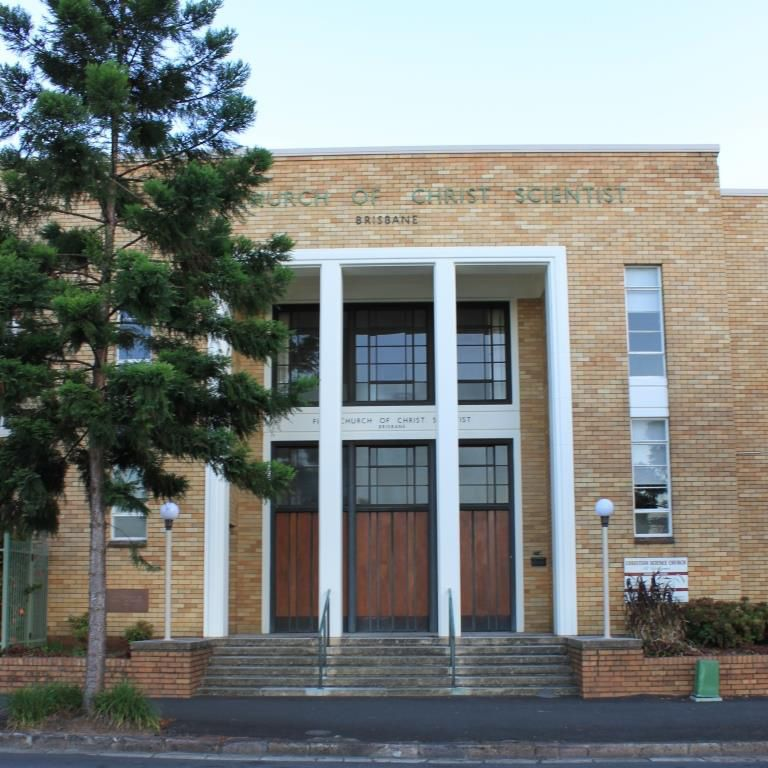
First Church of Christ, Scientist, Brisbane, 2015

When the Brisbane City Council decided to build the Grey Street Bridge, it was necessary to resume the property to facilitate road widening. However, until the council needed to use the land, the church were permitted to continue to lease it.

In about 1939 a portion of the land not needed for road widening was sold to the Church of Christ, Scientist to build the (now heritage-listed) First Church of Christ, Scientist in Brisbane and the house was sold for £148.
