= Patri Vergara =

Spanish veterinarian

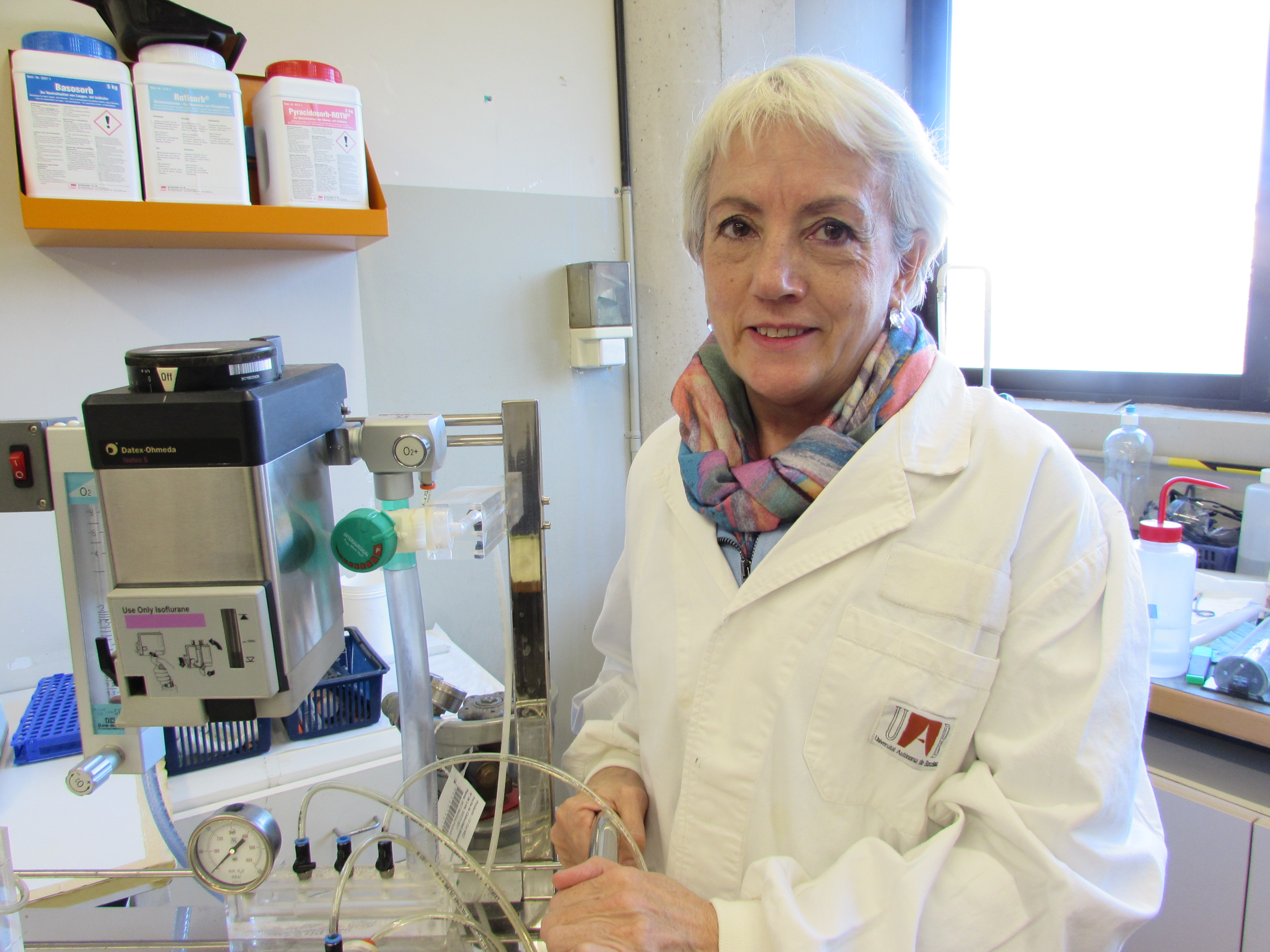
- Patri Vergara in 2020.
- Born: Patrocinio Vergara Esteras; Embid de Ariza, Zaragoza, Spain
- Occupations: Professor of Physiology, Universitat Autònoma de Barcelona, Spain
- Title: Professor emeritus

Academic background
- Education: Zaragoza University

Academic work
- Institutions: Faculty of Veterinary Science, Universidad Autónoma de Barcelona, Spain
- Main interests: Mast cell & microbiota research, Laboratory Animal Science

Patri Vergara is a professor in physiology at the veterinary faculty of the Autonomous University of Barcelona, Spain, and in 2011, was elected the first woman president of the International Council for Laboratory Animal Science.

== Early life and education ==
Patri Vergara was born in Embid de Ariza, Zaragoza, Spain in 1955, and graduated with a degree in Veterinary Medicine from the University of Zaragoza in 1978. In 1983, she received a PhD in veterinary science from Zaragoza University.

== Career ==
In 1987 Vergara appointed senior lecturer in physiology at the Faculty of Veterinary Medicine at the Autonomous University of Barcelona (UAB), Spain.In 2009, she became a full Professor at the UAB and in 2025, was appointed Professor emeritus.

Vergara has published over 80 research papers on the role of nitric oxide as the main inhibitory neurotransmitter in the gut; the role of gastrointestinal hormones (CCK, GLP-1) in the regulation of gastrointestinal motility; and the mechanisms involved in the development of inflammatory bowel disease with special attention to mast cells and nerve growth factor (NGF)

=== Laboratory Animal Science (LAS) ===
In 1989, she co-founded the Spanish Association of Laboratory Animal Science (SECAL) and in 1991, was nominated by SECAL as their scientific representative to the International Council for Laboratory Animal Science (ICLAS). In 1991, she was elected by the ICLAS General Assembly to serve on the ICLAS governing board, and in 1999, she was elected ICLAS treasurer.

In 2003, Vergara was elected as the first woman ICLAS Secretary General, and in 2006 she co-founded the ICLAS Network for Promotion of Animal Quality in Research with the aim of improving the quality of laboratory animals worldwide. From 2007-2009, she served as president of SECAL, and in 2011, she was elected as ICLAS's first woman president serving two consecutive four-year terms until 2019

=== Education and training ===
In 1988, Vergara co-founded the first Laboratory Animal Science Course in Spain at the UAB to provide education and training to people working with experimental animals.From 2000, she was principal coordinator of the UAB’s postgraduate training course and master's degree in LAS In 2014, she was instrumental in the creation of a postgraduate training course in LAS at the Tamil Nadu Veterinary and Animal Sciences University (TANUVAS) in India, which became the first FELASA accredited course outside Europe.

In 1994, she became a member of the management board of the Federation of European Laboratory Animal Science Associations (FELASA), and from 2005-2014, she was chair of the FELASA Accreditation Board for Training and Education in Laboratory Animal Science.

In 2000, Vergara co-founded the European College for Laboratory Animal Medicine (ECLAM) and served as a council member and treasurer until 2007. In 2014, she co-founded the ICLAS Scholarship Program for Veterinarians in Laboratory Animal Science and Medicine to increase the professional level of LAS personnel living in areas without access to training.

From 2020-2021, she was president of the European Platform for Education and Training in Laboratory Animal Science (ETPLAS)

== Awards ==
In November 2018, Vergara received the FELASA 40 Years Anniversary Educational Award based on her development of courses and teaching programmes and her pedagogical vision in LAS. In 2023, she received the ICLAS Coates-Demers Award in recognition of her30 years of outstanding commitment to ICLAS and its Programs, particularly in education & training in Laboratory Animal Science and Animal Quality.
