= Lady Bar =

2007 French television film

- Directed by: Xavier Durringer
- Written by: Xavier Durringer
- Starring: Éric Savin; Dao Paratee; Bruno Lopez
- Edited by: Laurence Briaud
- Music by: Christophe Gerber
- Production companies: 7e Apache Films; Arte France
- Release date: October 5, 2007 (France)
- Running time: 98 minutes
- Country: France
- Languages: French; Thai

Lady Bar is a 2007 French comedy-drama television film directed and written by Xavier Durringer. It was premiered on Arte France on October 5, 2007.

== Plot ==
Jean-Claude, a lonely French man in his forties who just god divorced, decides to leave his routine behind and travel to Thailand on vacation with his friend Patrick. Impressed by the nightlife of Bangkok and Pattaya, Jean-Claude navigates a world entirely foreign to him, far removed from his life back in France.

During the trip, Jean-Claude met Pat, a young Thai woman working as a "lady bar" attendant to financially support her family back in the rural Isan. The film ends as the relationship of Jean-Claude and Pat became deepr and deeper.

== Cast ==
- Éric Savin as Jean-Claude
- Dao Paratee as Pat
- Bruno Lopez as Polo
- Bongkoj Khongmalai as Aom
- Jean-Pierre Léonardini as Patrick
- Margot Abascal as the French woman

== Reception ==
The film received very good reviews and was released on DVD. A sequel, Lady Bar 2, was released in 2009.
