= Eye on Juliet =

2017 Canadian drama film

- Film poster
- Directed by: Kim Nguyen
- Written by: Kim Nguyen
- Produced by: Pierre Even
- Starring: Joe Cole; Lina El Arabi
- Cinematography: Christophe Collette
- Edited by: Richard Comeau
- Music by: Timber Timbre
- Production companies: Item 7; Agora Films
- Distributed by: Les Films Séville
- Release date: August 30, 2017 (Venice)
- Running time: 96 minutes
- Country: Canada
- Languages: English; Arabic

Eye on Juliet is a 2017 Canadian drama film written and directed by Kim Nguyen. It had its world premiere in the Venice Days program of the 74th Venice International Film Festival, and its North American premiere at the 2017 Toronto International Film Festival.

The film stars Joe Cole as Gordon, an oil pipeline supervisor who works through a robotic hexapod. Gordon's job is complicated when he becomes fascinated by Ayusha (Lina El Arabi), a young woman he glimpses one day through the drone's camera.

== Plot ==
Gordon works for an American security company, monitoring threats to their client's oil facility in an unnamed North African country, using dozens of hexapods that have the ability to shoot and cover a large area of desert.

Gordon has recently broken up with his girlfriend and is resisting his colleague's attempts to persuade him to "play the field". One day at work, he sees on his cameras a young woman, Ayusha, who resembles his ex. Ayusha is trapped in an arranged marriage and unable to be with her true love, Karim. As her family makes preparations for the wedding, Gordon becomes infatuated by the illicit couple's love, and Ayusha in particular, and takes pictures of the couple. He observes Ayusha undressing in her room via heat-seeking camera and witnesses the couple discussing the logistics of eloping together, which would require Karim to join an illegal project to raise funds. Ignoring the warnings of his supervisor, Peter, Gordon becomes more involved in the couple's lives, drugging Peter while on shift in order to operate freely and sending the couple money for their emigration.

Gordon subsequently observes Karim and his associate tampering with the pipeline. In the ensuing events, the oil catches fire, leading to Karim's death. Gordon informs Ayusha via one of the hexapods and fictionalises the final moments of Karim's life to gain her trust. He tells her about the money he sent her and convinces her to collect it from the bank and escape her family. Meanwhile, Peter confronts Gordon over his bizarre behaviour. Gordon somehow convinces Peter to jeopardise his own job and allow him time to facilitate Ayusha's escape. However, when the woman returns home, her family, aware of her suspicious behaviour, lock her in her room. Gordon sends a hexapod to break her out, and she follows it to her point of collection. Using the hexapod's microphone, Gordon tells her that she may have more than one soulmate and that observing someone like her, who is capable of true love, has made him happy. He also predicts that she might find another man and then makes her promise to meet him in Paris at exactly the same time the following year.

The next year in Paris, the two meet, and it is implied that they will embark on a romance.

== Cast ==
- Joe Cole as Gordon
- Lina El Arabi as Ayusha
- Faycal Zeglat as Karim
- Brent Skagford as Peter

== Reception ==
On the review aggregator website Rotten Tomatoes, 20% of 10 critics' reviews are positive, with an average rating of 4.5/10.
