= Ne m'abandonne pas =

2016 French television film

- Genre: Drama
- Screenplay by: Françoise Charpiat; Aude Marcle
- Directed by: Xavier Durringer
- Starring: Lina El Arabi; Samia Sassi; Sami Bouajila; Marc Lavoine
- Theme music composer: Nicolas Errèra
- Country of origin: France
- Original language: French

Production
- Producer: Joëy Faré
- Running time: 90 minutes
- Production company: Scarlett productions

Original release
- Network: France 2
- Release: 3 February 2016

Ne m'abandonne pas (French for Don't Leave Me) is a French TV movie directed by Xavier Durringer, which was broadcast on 3 February 2016 on France 2. The film deals with the topic of young French Muslims who are radicalized and encouraged to go to Syria to join the civil war.

== Synopsis ==
A French woman experiences her worst nightmare when she discovers that her 17-year-old daughter has been radicalized and plans to travel to Syria to meet her new husband, a jihadist she met online. In order to prevent this, the mother decides to completely isolate her daughter.

== Cast ==
- Lina El Arabi as Chama
- Samia Sassi as Inès, Chama's mother
- Sami Bouajila as Sami, Chama's father
- Marc Lavoine as Adrien, Louis' father
- Léo Legrand as Louis, Chama's boyfriend, who is fighting in Syria
- Tassadit Mandi as Chama's grandmother
- Sofia Lesaffre as Yasmina, Chama's best friend
- Louise Szpindel as Manon, an ex-convert back from Syria
- Virgile M'Fouilou as Lieutenant Logley
- Meriem Serbah as Nora
- Bachir Tliti as Benjamin
- Évelyne El Garby Klaï as Djemila, Sami's companion
- Théo Taggueb as Noam, Chams's half-brother
- Zoé Daddi-Bourcy as Louisa, Chama's half-sister
- Clara Pirali as Carole
- Nadir Louatib as Omar, a friend of Louis
- Louis-Marie Audubert as the postman

== Awards and recognition ==
Wins

- 2017 International Emmy Awards: Best TV Movie/Miniseries
- 2017 Monte Carlo TV Festival: Best Long Fiction Program
- 2016 Seoul International Drama Awards: Best Actress for Samia Sassi
- 2016 Seoul International Drama Awards: Best TV Movie

Nominations

- Monte Carlo TV Festival 2017: Outstanding Actor in a Miniseries for Marc Lavoine

== Legacy ==
A petition was launched in 2016 to request the broadcast of the film in all French high schools. Addressed to Najat Vallaud-Belkacem, the French Minister of National Education, the petition succeeded in reaching its objective of 43,172 signatures, and the Minister responded favourably to the project.
