= Lina El Arabi =

French actress (born 1995)

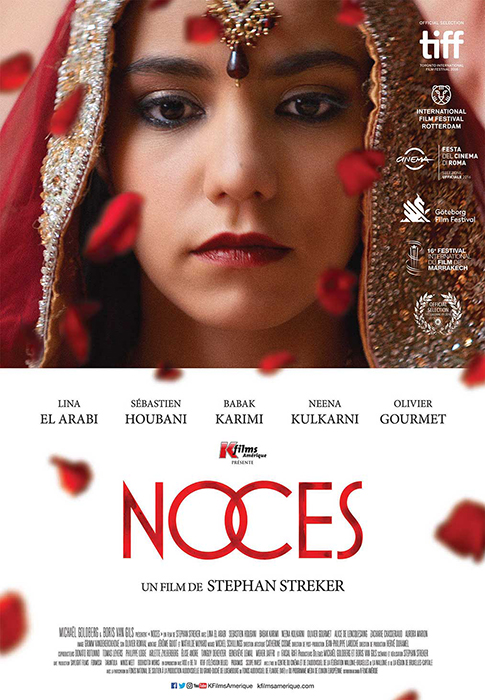
- Lina El Arabi on film poster of A Wedding, 2016
- Born: 11 August 1995 (age 30); Choisy-le-Roi, France
- Occupation: Actress
- Known for: A Wedding, Furies

Lina El Arabi (born 11 August 1995) is a French actress of Moroccan heritage.

== Biography ==
El Arabi was born in Choisy-le-Roi, France, in 1995. At age six, she began playing violin at the Choisy-le-Roi conservatory, and at ten, she got involved in theatre work. She later also studied journalism at the Institut pratique du journalisme in Paris.

In 2016, she was cast in the lead role of the television film Ne m'abandonne pas, about a radicalized Muslim teenager.

In 2017, she landed the lead role of Zahira Kazim in Stephan Streker's A Wedding (French: Noces), where she plays a young Belgian-Pakistani girl who is forced by her family into a traditional marriage. El Arabi won the Valois award for best actress at the Angoulême Francophone Film Festival.

In 2019, El Arabi had a recurring role in the comedy series Family Business, which was distributed internationally by Netflix.

In 2024, she landed the leading role in the French Netflix series Furies.

== Selected filmography ==
=== Film ===
List of film appearances, with year, title, and role shown
Year	Title	Role	Notes
2016	A Wedding	Zahira Kazim	
2017	Eye on Juliet	Ayusha	
2020	Brutus vs César	Albana	

=== Television ===
List of television appearances, with year, title, and role shown
Year	Title	Role	Notes
2016	Ne m'abandonne pas	Chama	TV movie
2017	Kaboul Kitchen	Pissenlit	Main cast (season 3)
2019	Family Business	Aïda Benkikir	Recurring role (seasons 1–2)
2024	Furies	Lyna Guerrab	Lead role
2026	Citadel	Celine Rohr	Recurring role (season 2)
