= Furies (TV series) =

French action drama television series

- Genre: Action drama
- Created by: Cedric Nicolas-Troyan; Jean-Yves Arnaud; Yoann Legave
- Screenplay by: Quoc Dang Tran
- Starring: Lina El Arabi; Marina Foïs; Mathieu Kassovitz
- Country of origin: France
- Original language: French
- No. of seasons: 2
- No. of episodes: 14

Production
- Producers: Raphaël Rocher; Eric Laroche
- Running time: 45 minutes
- Production companies: Daïmôn Films; Empreinte Digitale

Original release
- Network: Netflix
- Release: 1 March 2024 – present

Furies is a French action drama television series, produced and streamed by Netflix, created by Cedric Nicolas-Troyan, Jean-Yves Arnaud, and Yoann Legave, and starring Lina El Arabi, Marina Foïs, and Mathieu Kassovitz. It premiered on 1 March 2024.

== Synopsis ==
Furies follows Lyna, a student "yearning for the simplicity of a normal life" with her boyfriend Elie, a police officer. Her parents are criminals, however, and when they are gunned down in a mob-related attack, Lyna goes to jail for refusing to tell the police who killed them. Upon release, she starts a search for the killers, which leads her to Selma, a.k.a. the Fury, who wants to recruit Lyna to follow in her footsteps. It is the job of the Fury to keep the peace among Paris's six major crime families.

== Cast and characters ==
- Lina El Arabi as Lyna Guerrab
- Marina Foïs as Selma, the Fury
- Mathieu Kassovitz as Driss
- Steve Tientcheu as Simon
- Quentin Faure as Nico
- Jérémy Nadeau as Elie
- Sandor Funtek as Orso
- Anne Azoulay as Mama
- Eye Haïdara as Keïta
- Fatima Adoum as Amythis Guerrab

== Reception ==
The series has elicited comparisons to the work of Luc Besson.
