= Mater Group =

Hospital company in Queensland

Coordinates: 27.485540°S 153.028618°E

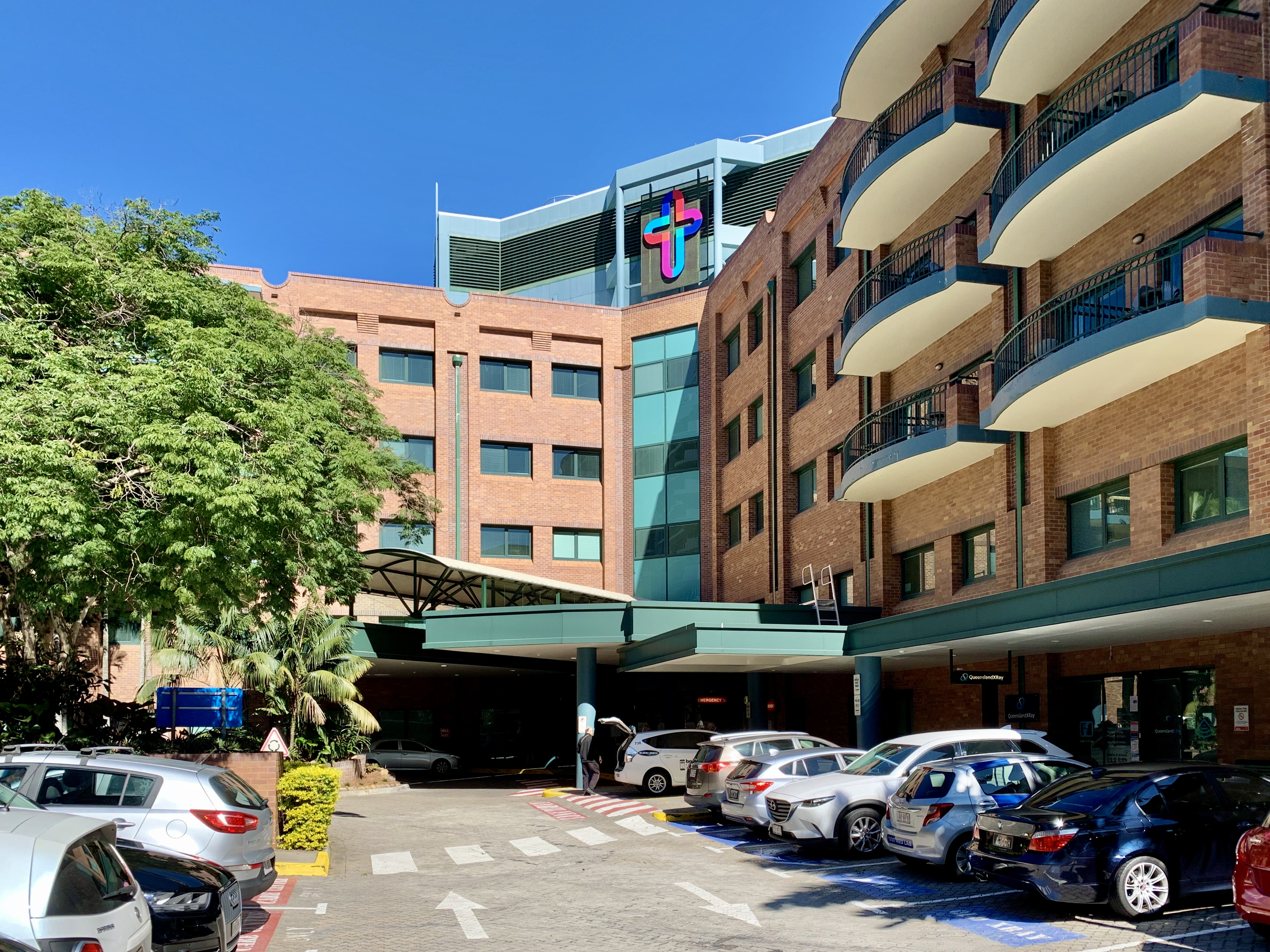
- Mater Private Hospital in Brisbane, 2020
- Type: Healthcare
- Founded: 2016; 10 years ago
- Headquarters: Brisbane, Australia
- Website: mater.org.au

Mater Group was formed in 2016 by aligning Mater Health, Mater Education, Mater Research and Mater Foundation under a single, unified banner. Mater provides care for some 500,000 patients each year. Mater was established in 1906 by the Sisters of Mercy. In 2002, Mater became an incorporated body, charged with the responsibility to continue the Mission of the Sisters of Mercy to "offer compassionate service to the sick and needy".

== History ==
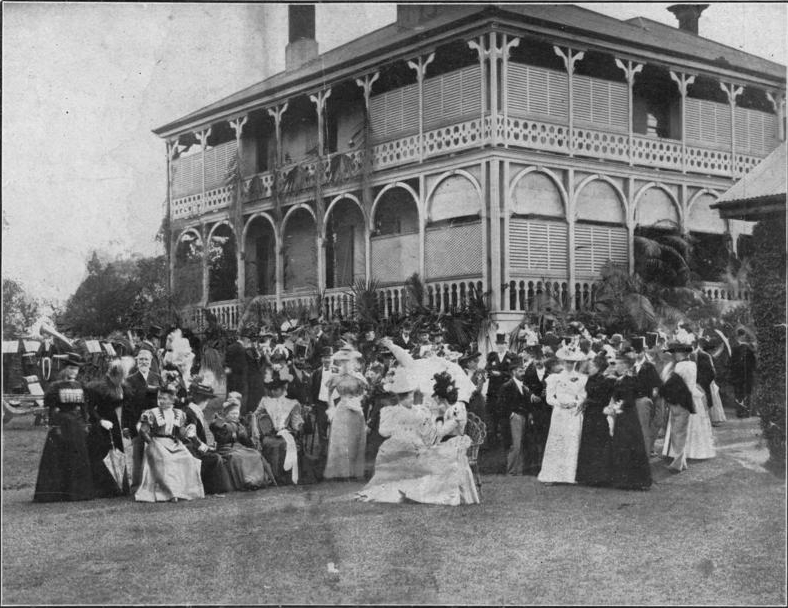
Aubigny, at North Quay, Brisbane, 1897, before it was used as the first Mater Hospital

In 1906, the Sisters of Mercy opened the first Mater Hospital in a private house, Aubigny, at North Quay. The house was converted into a 20-bed private hospital. In 1911, the funds generated by the first Mater Private Hospital, and its successor at South Brisbane, allowed the Sisters of Mercy to open a free public hospital for the city of Brisbane.

The branding Mater Misericordiae is a translation from Latin of "Mother of Mercy", and was named after the Mater Hospital in Dublin, Ireland (1861) and previous Mater Hospitals in Pittsburgh (1847) and Cork (1857).

In 1919, Queensland's first hospital laboratory was established at the Mater. In 1928, the Mater Public Hospital installed Queensland's first deep X-ray therapy machine to treat cancer patients.

In 1931, Mater opened the 80 bed Mater Children's Hospital, the first Children's Hospital south of the Brisbane River, treating over 8,266 patients in its first year of operation.

In 1953, eastern Australia's first eye bank opened at the Mater. In 1954, Mater established Queensland's first Neurological Department.

In 1960, the Mater Mothers' Hospital was officially opened, accommodating for 140 mothers. In 1967 blood transfusions were performed on a baby in utero for the first time in Queensland.

In 1987 Mater Children's Hospital established Queensland's first paediatric sleep unit. In 1988 the Brisbane Mater Health Service was the official health provider for Brisbane's Expo 88. In 1989 the Mater Private Priority Emergency Centre was opened, the first in any Queensland hospital.

In 1998, the Mater Children's Private Hospital opens becoming Australia's first private paediatric facility. On 14 April 1999, the Mater Private Hospital in Gladstone officially opened.

In 2000, then Mater Private Hospital in Redland opened. In 2006, Mater Health Services becomes the first institution to win a Queensland Greats Awards. In 2008, the new Mater Mothers' Hospitals opened on the South Brisbane campus.

In 2010, Mater Private Hospital Brisbane became the first private hospital in Queensland to launch an automatic notification system for tissue donation.

In 2014, Mater Children's Hospital closed after 83 years replaced by the new Lady Cilento Children's Hospital. Mater Children's Private Brisbane is still operational.

Aerial photograph of a portion of the Mater Group campus at South Brisbane in 2004.

In mid-2014, Mater Health Services joined with seven other organisations to form the Brisbane Diamantina Health Partners, with the aim to work collaboratively to improve health outcomes through the integration of research, education and clinical delivery.

In mid-2015, Mater Centre for Neurosciences opened. In October 2015, Mater Private Hospital Springfield opened. In July 2015, a truck collided with the overhead footbridge attached to the Mater Hospital in Brisbane which crosses Raymond Terrace, causing damages costing $170,000. Mater Group attempted to sue the truck driver and his employer but the claim was dismissed with a subsequent appeal also dismissed. In 2015, the 18-bed Mater Hospital in Yeppoon was closed due to not being financially viable, with the opening of the new Capricorn Coast Hospital, the close proximity of the Rockhampton Hospital and low patient numbers named as contributing factors.

In 2020, the 33-bed Mater Private Hospital in Gladstone was closed due to no longer being viable. It had operated for 21 years, closing departments from 2018 until final closure in 2020. After it was listed for sale in 2019, it was purchased by Queensland Health in 2020 and incorporated into the existing public health facilities.

== Private hospitals ==
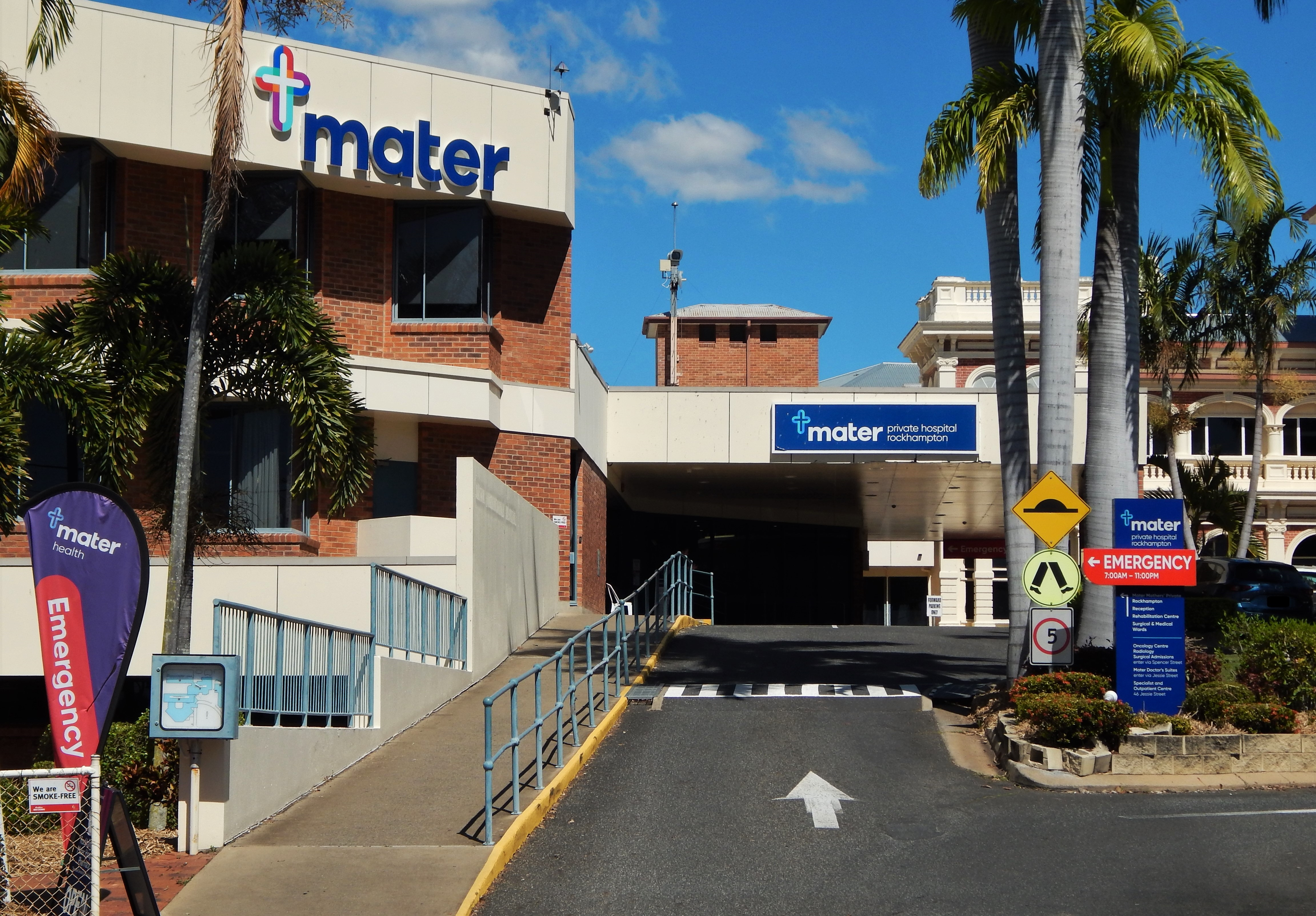
Mater Private Hospital in Rockhampton, 2022

- Mater Children's Private Brisbane
- Mater Mothers' Private Brisbane
- Mater Private Hospital Brisbane
- Mater Private Hospital Bundaberg
- Mater Private Hospital Redland
- Mater Private Hospital Rockhampton
- Mater Private Hospital Springfield
- Mater Private Hospital Mackay
- Mater Private Hospital Townsville

== Public hospitals ==
- Mater Hospital Brisbane (formerly Mater Adult Hospital)
- Mater Children's Hospital (closed 29 November 2014)
- Mater Mothers' Hospital

Mater's public hospitals have received backlash for applying Catholic code of conduct to patients in a public hospital, specifically concerning the restrictions surrounding reproductive health.

== See also ==
- Mater Health Services North Queensland
- List of hospitals in Australia
