= Xavier Durringer =

French playwright, screenwriter, director and novelist (1963–2025)

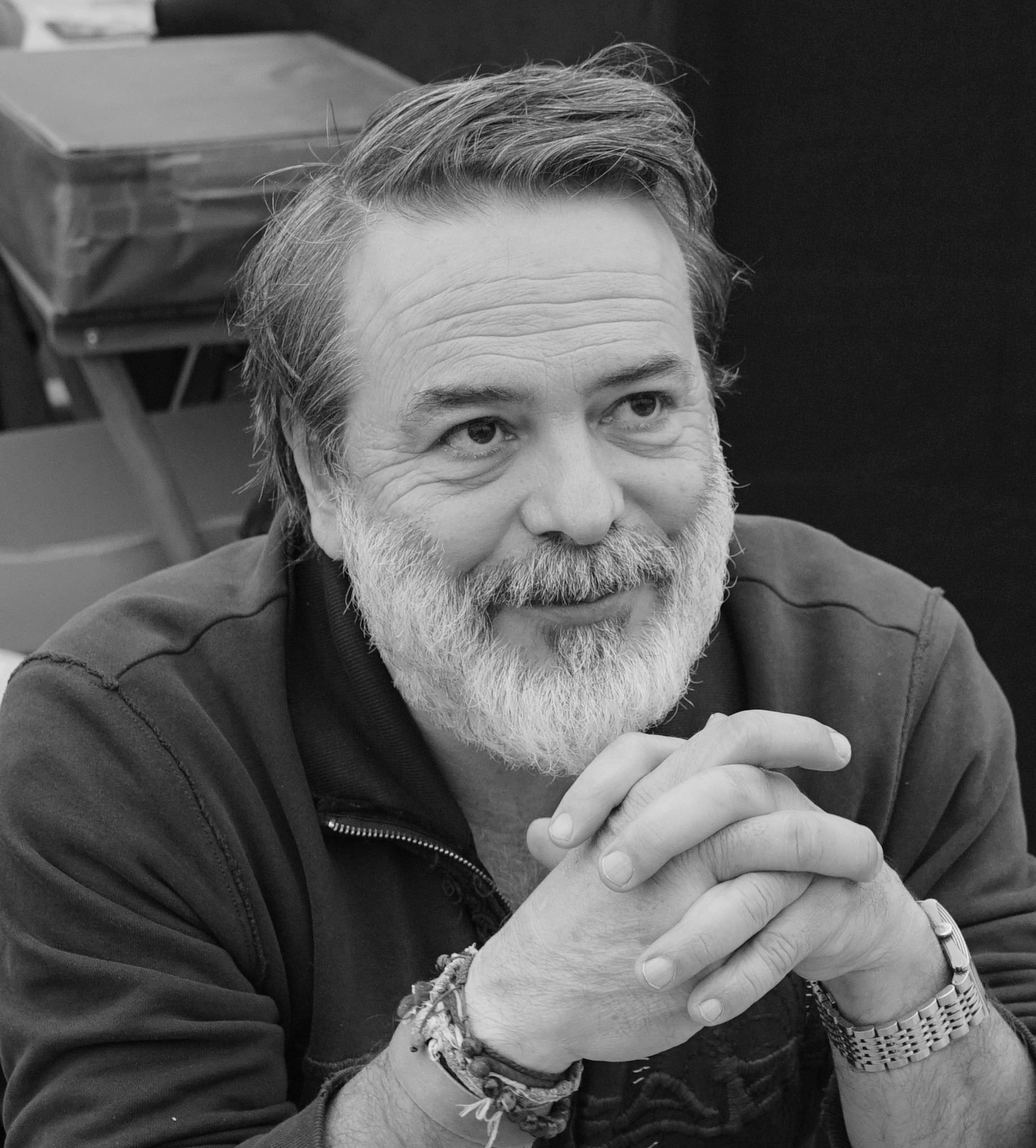
- Durringer in 2017
- Born: 1 December 1963; Montigny-lès-Cormeilles, France
- Died: 4 October 2025 (aged 61); L'Isle-sur-la-Sorgue, France
- Occupations: Writer, playwright, screenwriter, director

Xavier Durringer (1 December 1963 – 4 October 2025) was a French playwright, screenwriter, writer and director.

== Life and career ==
Born in Paris on 1 December 1963 he began by taking drama classes aged 18. At the end of the 1980s he created a theatre company called La Lézarde.

Durringer died from a heart attack at his home in L'Isle-sur-la-Sorgue, on 4 October 2025, at the age of 61.

== Partial filmography ==
- 1993: La Nage indienne
- 1997: J'irai au paradis car l'enfer est ici
- 2005: Chok-Dee
- 2007: Lady Bar
- 2011: La Conquête
- 2013: La Source
- 2015: Rappelle-toi
- 2016: Ne m'abandonne pas
- 2019: Paradise Beach
- 2022: L'Homme parfait
