= Embid de Ariza =

- municipality
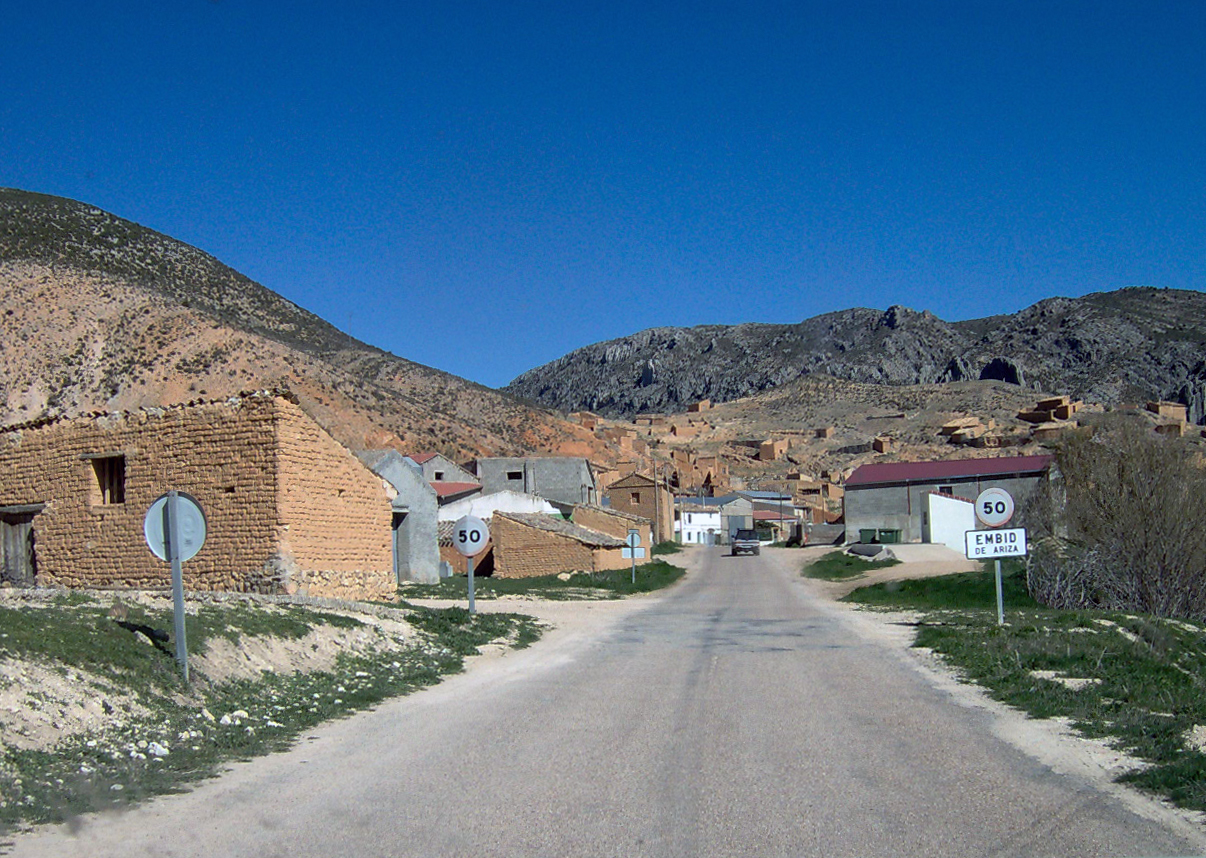

- Flag Coat of arms

- Location within Aragon Location within Spain Location within Europe
- Coordinates: 41°23′N 1°58′W
- Country: Spain
- Autonomous community: Aragon
- Province: Zaragoza

Area
  - Total: 41 km^{2} (16 sq mi)
- Elevation: 675 m (2,215 ft)

Population (2025-01-01)
  - Total: 28
  - Density: 0.68/km^{2} (1.8/sq mi)
- Time zone: UTC+1 (CET)
  - Summer (DST): UTC+2 (CEST)

Embid de Ariza is a municipality located in the province of Zaragoza, Aragon, Spain. According to the 2004 census (INE), the municipality has a population of 84 inhabitants.

== See also ==
- List of municipalities in Zaragoza
