= Mater Women's and Children's Hospital =

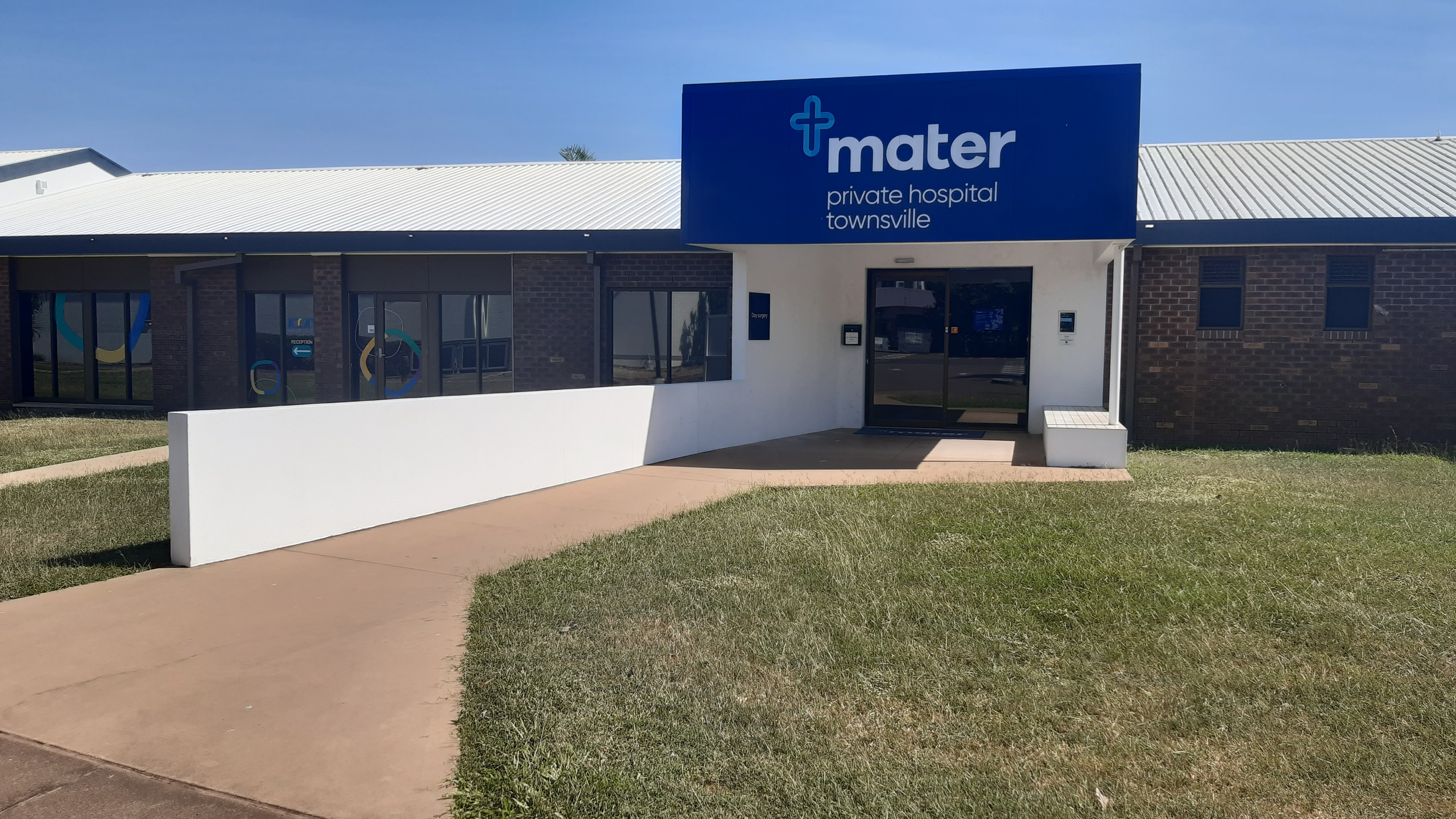
- The entrance in 2025

- Mater Women's and Children's Hospital in Australia Map

Geography
- Location: Queensland, Australia
- Coordinates: 19°16′21.4″S 146°48′12″E

Organisation
- Type: Private

History
- Founded: 2007

Links
- Lists: Hospitals in Australia

Mater Women's and Children's Hospital in Hyde Park, Townsville, Queensland was established in 2007 when the Sisters of Mercy (Mater Health Services North Queensland) bought the competing private obstetric hospital, the Wesley/Park Haven Hospital.

== History ==
The Park Haven Private Hospital opened in 1937, and was purchased by the Brisbane UnitingCare Wesley Hospital in 1999.

== Facilities ==
The Mater Women's and Children's Hospital has a bed capacity of 58. Current specialty areas represented are gynaecology, obstetrics, paediatrics, general surgery, orthopaedics, urology, oncology, and plastic surgery.
