= Mater Hospital Pimlico =

Mater Private Hospital Townsville, Pimlico Campus
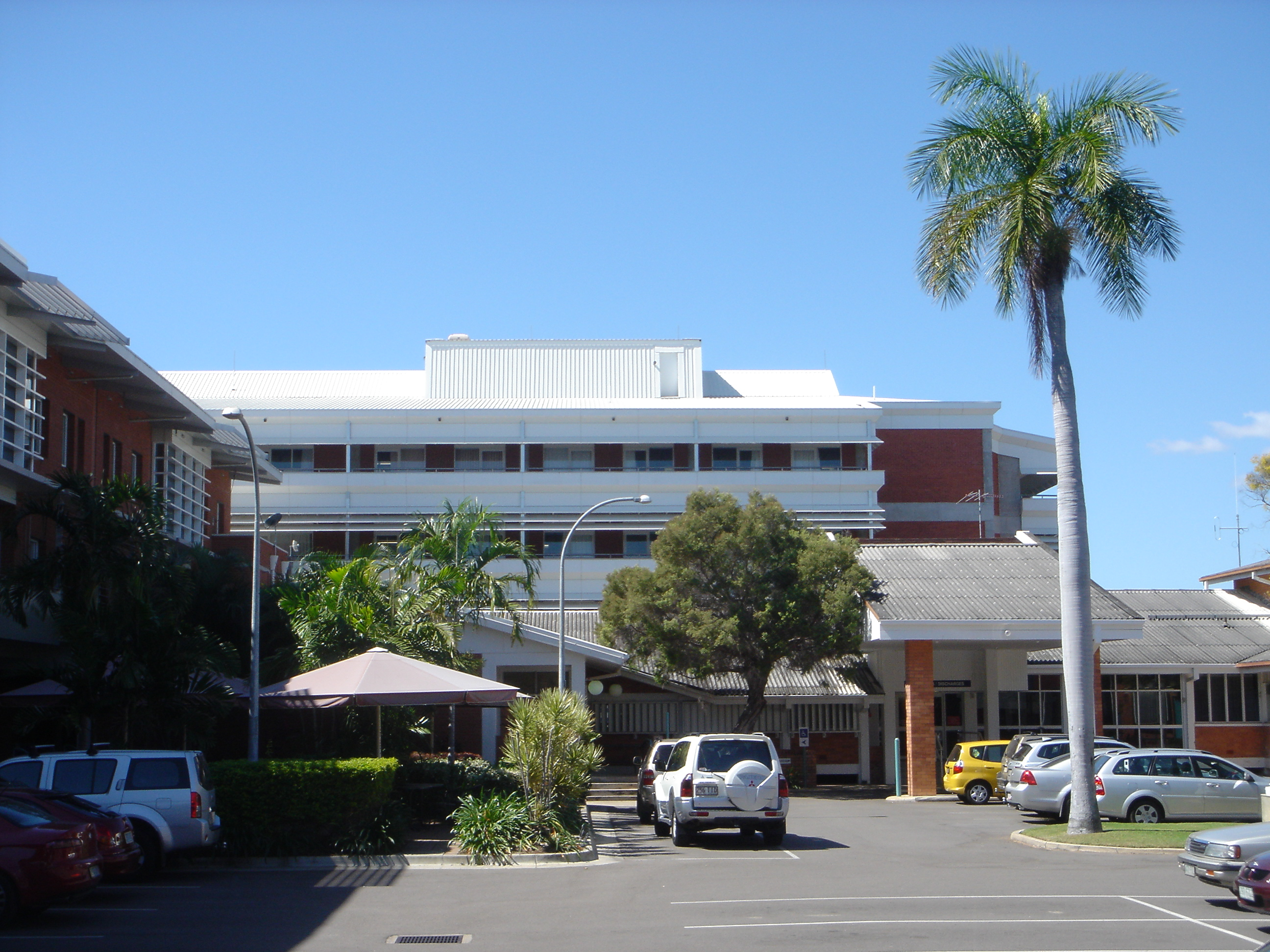
- The Mater Hospital from the inner courtyard

- Mater Hospital Pimlico in Australia Map

Geography
- Location: Townsville, Queensland, Australia
- Coordinates: 19.289°S 146.7872°E

Links
- Lists: Hospitals in Australia

The Mater Private Hospital, Pimlico, formerly known as the Mater Misericordiae Hospital, and commonly known as 'The Mater', is the largest private hospital in Townsville, Queensland, Australia. It is located in the central inner suburb of Pimlico. The hospital provides specialist care in most medical and surgical fields. It is a component of Mater Health Services North Queensland Limited.
