= Mater Health Services North Queensland =

Mater Health Services North Queensland Limited
- Type: Healthcare
- Founded: 1945
- Headquarters: Townsville, Queensland, Australia
- Key people: Mr Gerrard Wyvill (CEO); Dr John Stokes (Dir.Med); Ms Karen Gerrard (EDON); Mr James Barrett (Dir.Fin); Ms Trudy Clarke (Dir.Mis)
- Website: https://www.mater.org.au/hospitals/mater-private-hospital-townsville

Mater Health Services North Queensland operates two private hospitals, one established by the Sisters of Mercy in 1945 named Mater Hospital Pimlico (Formally the Mater Misericordiae Hospital Townsville) and the second purchased in 2007 named the Mater Women's and Children's Hospital Hyde Park (formerly the Wesley/Park Haven Hospital Hyde Park).

== History ==
Five Sisters of Mercy, members of the Brisbane Congregation, arrived in Townsville in 1878. They began their ministry from a 'cottage on the shores of Cleveland Bay'.

In 1882, Rockhampton was declared a Diocese and the Townsville group was governed from there until 1901, when the group became self-governing with the formation of a Townsville Congregation. Thirteen Sisters were foundation members made up of Sisters from the Brisbane and Rockhampton Congregations who chose to stay in the North.

Over the years the number of Sisters grew and their ministries diversified. Care of sick people was a well-established tradition among Sisters of Mercy, and in keeping with that, the decision was made in 1945 to establish a Catholic hospital in Townsville.

A small private hospital in Stagpole Street, known as 'The Lister', was purchased and the Townsville Sisters of Mercy moved formally into Health Care ministry. The hospital was renamed the 'Mater Misericordiae' (Mother of Mercy), the title given to all hospitals operated by the Sisters of Mercy.

When this hospital was found to be inadequate to meet the demands of modern health care, a property was purchased in Fulham Road and a new 50-bed hospital was opened in 1962. The transfer to the new hospital was made possible by the support given to the Sisters of Mercy by local fund raisers.

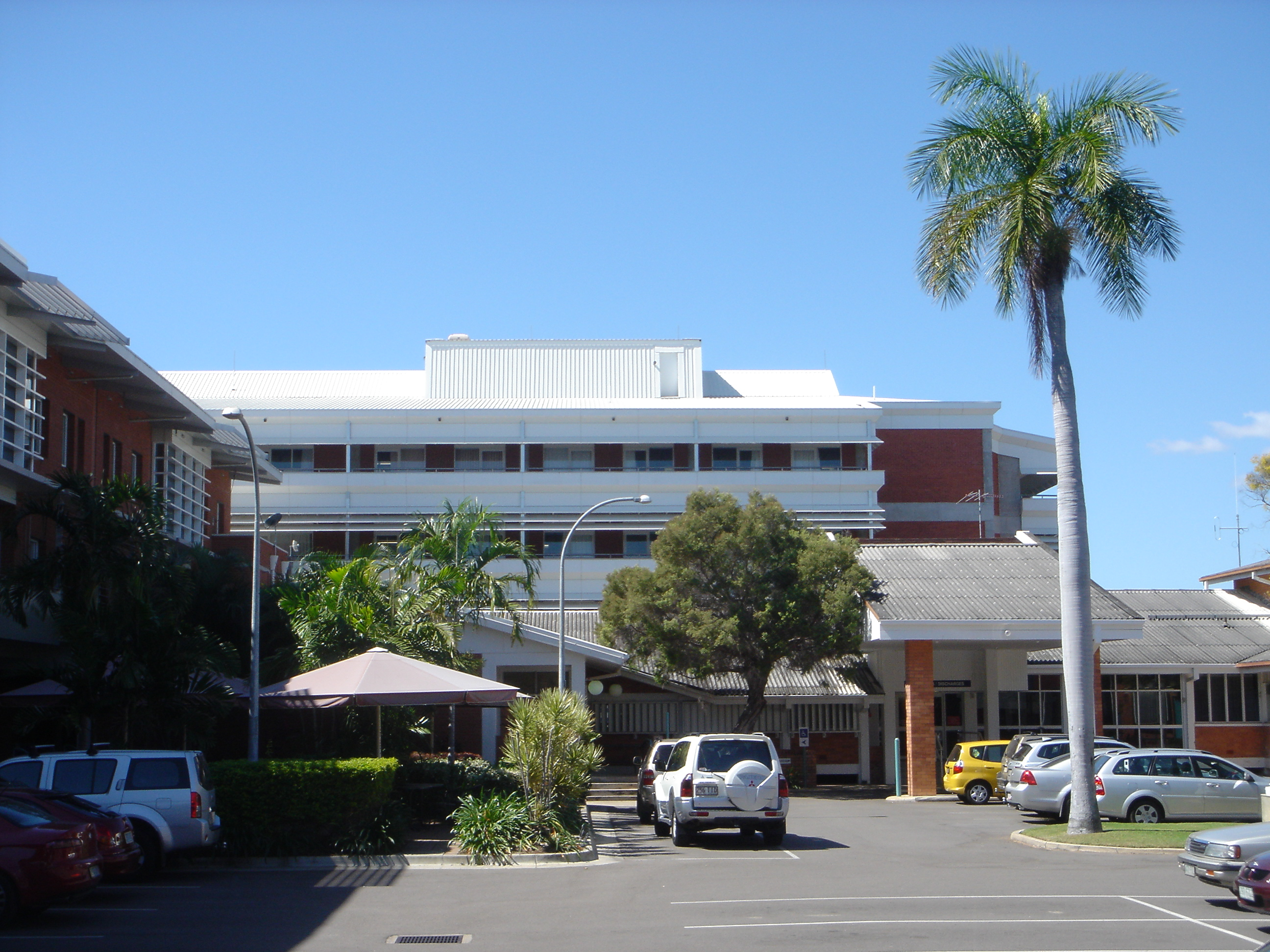
The Mater Hospital Pimlico from the inner courtyard

== Hospitals ==
Mater Hospital Pimlico is an acute Medical/Surgical facility with a bed capacity of 158. Specialties represented include Cardiac Surgery, Cardiac Catheter Laboratories, Coronary Care Unit, Intensive Care Unit, Endoscopy, Interventional Radiology, Orthopaedics, Neurosurgery, Respiratory Laboratory, Urodynamics, and Sleep Studies Unit. The Mater Outreach Services is composed of the Post Traumatic Stress Disorder Unit (PTSD) and the Cardiac Rehabilitation Services.

Mater Women's and Children's Hospital in Hyde Park was established in 2007 and is a Medical/Surgical facility with a present bed capacity of 70. Current specialty areas include Women's, Children's, Obstetrics, General Surgery, Urology, Day Oncology, Urodynamics and Plastics.

== Developments ==
- 1967 – A 12-bed Medical Unit – Total bed capacity 62.
- 1972 – A two-storey building to accommodate 2 units of 19 and 20 beds, and a new Education Unit – Total bed capacity: 101
- 1979 – A two-storey building to accommodate a 20-bed Surgical Unit, new Operating facilities, Medical Records, a new Main Entrance, and a 6-bed extension to the Maternity Unit – Total Bed Capacity: 127
- 1984 – A three-storey building to accommodate Radiology, a 20-bed Surgical Unit and a 20-bed Medical Unit – Total bed capacity: 167
- 1985 – A new Conference Room and facilities, and additions to the Education Unit
- 1986 – A new Maintenance Workshop, solar hot water system, and renovations to the Nurses Home to accommodate the Townsville Anaesthetic Group.
- 1987 – Energy Block addition to the workshop, and air conditioning extended to all areas of the hospital. A new Laundry.
- 1990 – A single-storey building to accommodate 5 Medical Consulting Suites
- 1992 – A four-storey building to accommodate Endoscopy, Laser, Interventional Radiology, Cardiac Catheter facilities, a Maternity Unit – 22 beds and 4 neo-natal cots, a Surgical Unit – 40 beds and a Medical Unit – 40 Beds. Total Bed Capacity: 167
- 1993 – Renovations to allow for ICU/CCU – 11 beds, a larger entrance foyer, Administration, Medical Records, and expansion of the Central Sterilising and Supply Unit, an additional Operating Room – total 5 – and 3 more Recovery Room bays – total 9. Total bed capacity: 167
- 1994 – Extension to accommodate a Respiratory Unit and a Physiotherapy Unit.
- 1996 – Construction of a discrete day surgery unit.
- 1997 – Opening of sleep disorder unit. Construction of motel-type accommodation for patients' relatives and units for staff.
- 1998 – Opening of emergency unit and purpose-built children's unit. Refurbishment of the day unit to include the Discrete Cardiac Catheter Laboratory, interventional radiography, endoscopy, urodynamics, and new recovery room. Commencement of haemophoresis therapy. Expansion of the hospital volunteer service to now include in-hospital volunteer services, cardiac support group (composed of past patients) to assist with patient support, Mater Hospital Cardiac Unit Auxiliary Inc to assist with patient support and fund raising.
- 1999 – Refurbishment of radiology, including the installation of magnetic resonance image (MRI) and nuclear medicine service.
- 2000 – Opening of Lothair Street complex, including operating room suite, intensive care and cardiac services, pathology services, purchasing, kitchen and cafeteria.
- 2001 – Affiliation of the Mater with James Cook University in regard to medical and nursing education and research clinics at the Mater with the relocation of 13 doctors (later 28). Cardiac Rehabilitation Programme commenced in April. Post traumatic stress disorder unit (PTSD) is officially opened by the prime minister. Mater becomes an incorporated body (July). Blessing and opening of Sr Dorothea Loth Unit. Re-accreditation. Relative accommodation, Fulham Road completed.
- 2002 – Ante-natal and post-natal clinics. Computer system upgrade to PiMS. Launch of hospital website
- 2003 – Blessing and opening of the new surgical admission unit. Alterations to Level 1 to provide space for new Pelvic Health Unit (Prof AJ Rane). New Medical Suite and Allied Health Rooms (Reach Rehabilitation, SportsMed Physiotherapy) are the result of refurbishment of old Intensive Care and later Cardiac Rehabilitation Unit. Medical Offices with space for a total of 28 Doctors. Northern Pathology relocates to Sr Dorothea Complex (beneath Intensive Care Unit).
- 2004 – New endoscopy unit
- 2005 – Construction of a new Cardiac Catheter Laboratory. Commencement of Day Oncology Unit and Clinical Trial Centre.
- 2006 – Construction of 2 additional consulting suites in the Mater Medical Centre. Relocation of PTSD to off site premises in Mooney Street. Demolition of Administration building on corner of Fulham Road / Park Street.
- 2007 – Purchase of The Wesley Hospital Townsville – 58-bed Medical / Surgical facility. Total Bed Capacity: 225
- 2008 – Move of Women's and Children's unit to the Hyde Park campus. Change in company name from Mater Misericordiae Hospital to Mater Health Services North Queensland Limited (MHSNQ). MHSNQ is broken into three parts. Mater Hospital Pimlico, Mater Women's and Children's Hospital, and Mater Outreach Services which consists of the Cardiac Rehabilitation Services and Post Traumatic Stress Disorder Unit (PTSD). The Mater also inherits a new logo.
- 2009 – Construction of medical suites (Lister House) at Mater Women's and Children's Hospital Hyde Park.
- 2010 – Construction of new Education Centre at the Pimlico Campus. Funding for this building was received from the Department of Health and Ageing and the facility is a joint initiative with James Cook University.
- 2011 – Launch of new hospital website.

== Accreditation ==
Mater Health Services North Queensland utilises the programme developed by The Australian Council on Healthcare Standards' (ACHS), and Evaluation and Quality Improvement Programme (EQuIP) as a framework to implement and evaluate quality improvement systems through accreditation surveys.
