= Epidemiology of snakebites =

Map showing the approximate world distribution of snakes.

Map showing the global distribution of snakebite morbidity.

Most snakebites are caused by non-venomous snakes. Of the roughly 3,700 known species of snake found worldwide, only 15% are considered dangerous to humans. Snakes are found on every continent except Antarctica. There are two major families of venomous snakes, Elapidae and Viperidae. 325 species in 61 genera are recognized in the family Elapidae and 224 species in 22 genera are recognized in the family Viperidae, In addition, the most diverse and widely distributed snake family, the colubrids, has approximately 700 venomous species, but only five genera—boomslangs, twig snakes, keelback snakes, green snakes, and slender snakes—have caused human fatalities.

Since reporting is not mandatory in many regions of the world, snakebites often go unreported. Consequently, no accurate study has ever been conducted to determine the frequency of snakebites on the international level. However, some estimates put the number at 1.2 to 5.5 million snakebites, 421,000 envenomings, resulting in perhaps 20,000 deaths, but the actual number of deaths may be as high as 94,000. Many people who survive bites nevertheless have permanent tissue damage caused by venom, leading to disability. Most snake envenomings and fatalities occur in South Asia, Southeast Asia, and sub-Saharan Africa, with India reporting the most snakebite deaths of any country. An analysis cross-referencing exposure to venomous snakes and accessibility of medical treatment identified that 93 million people worldwide are highly vulnerable to dying from snakebite.

Available evidence on the effect of climate change on the epidemiology of snakebite is limited but it is expected that there will be a geographic shift in risk of snakebite: northwards in North America and southwards in South America and in Mozambique, and increase in incidence of bite in Sri Lanka.

Worldwide, snakebites occur most frequently in the summer season when snakes are active and humans are outdoors. Agricultural and tropical regions report more snakebites than anywhere else. In North America, the victims are typically male and between 17 and 27 years of age. Children and the elderly are the most likely to die.

Number of Snakebite Envenomings per Year
Region	Low Estimate	High Estimate
Asia	237,379	1,184,550
Australasia	1,099	1,260
Caribbean	1,098	8,039
Europe	3,961	9,902
Latin America	80,329	129,084
North Africa / Middle East	3,017	80,191
North America	2,683	3,858
Oceania	361	4,635
Sub-Saharan Africa	90,622	419,639
Total:	420,549	1,841,158

Number of Deaths from Envenoming per Year
Region	Low Estimate	High Estimate
Asia	15,385	57,636
Australasia	2	4
Caribbean	107	1,161
Europe	48	128
Latin America	540	2,298
North Africa / Middle East	43	78
North America	5	7
Oceania	227	516
Sub-Saharan Africa	3,529	32,117
Total:	19,886	93,945

== Africa ==
Although Africa is home to four venomous snake families—Atractaspididae, Colubridae, Elapidae, and Viperidae—approximately 60% of all bites are caused by vipers alone. In drier regions of the continent, such as sahels and savannas, the saw-scaled vipers inflict up to 90% of all bites. The puff adder is responsible for the most fatalities overall, although saw-scaled vipers (Echis spp) inflict more bites in North African countries, where the puff adder is typically not found. The black mamba (Dendroaspis polylepis) is classified as the snake of highest medical importance in Africa by the World Health Organization, (Note: Snakes of Medical Importance include those with highly dangerous venom resulting in high rates of morbidity and mortality, or those that are common agents in snakebite.) and although it is responsible for fewer snakebite incidents than snakes like puff adders, it is the species with the highest mortality rate in Africa and in the world (per capita) if left untreated. Before the advent of a polyvalent antivenom produced by the South African Institute for Medical Research, black mamba envenomation was certain to cause fatality (100% rate).

Most bites occur in industrial plantations, which attract many types of snake prey. Banana plantations are associated with vipers such as night adders, while rubber and palm tree plantations attract elapids, including cobras and black mambas. Important African cobra species include the Cape cobra and the black-necked spitting cobra. In forested areas of Guinea, cobras may inflict more than 30% of all venomous bites.

Mambas, cobras, and some larger viper species from the genus Bitis may claim territories of up to 1 to 2 square kilometres (0.4 to 0.8 sq mi), which are used by the snakes for hunting and reproduction. These snakes are large enough to defend their territory from intruders, including humans. The black mamba, in particular, is among the most venomous snakes in the world and one of the most aggressive. It is the longest venomous snake on the continent and is able to move at 11 kilometres per hour (6.8 mph), making it unusually dangerous. Although black mambas cause only 0.5-1% of snakebites in South Africa, they produce the highest mortality rate and the species is responsible for many snake bite fatalities. The black mamba is the species with the highest mortality rate in every single nation in which it occurs, despite not being responsible for the most numerous snakebites. It is also the species which has the highest mortality rate worldwide. Although antivenom saves many lives, mortality due to black mamba envenomation is still at 14%, even with antivenom treatment. In addition to antivenom treatment, endotracheal intubation and mechanical ventilation are required for supportive therapy.

There are also venomous colubrids in Africa, although of these only two arboreal genera, the boomslang and the twig snakes, are likely to inflict life-threatening bites. Of the Atractaspididae, Atractaspis is the species involved in the majority of bites. Since these snakes are nocturnal and fossorial, living in burrows underground, bites remain rare, peaking at 1 to 3% in certain areas of the Sudanian savanna. However, there is no antivenom or other effective therapy for Atractaspis envenomation, and the case fatality rate remains approximately 10%, with death typically occurring quickly.

Snakebites in Africa are most common in the sub-Saharan countries (scorpion stings are more common in Northern Africa), and typically occur during the rainy season when snakes are more active. Agricultural plantations and pastoral areas are involved in approximately 50 to 60% of reported snakebites, while outdoor activities such as collecting firewood and water account for another 20% of bites. Approximately 1 million snakebites occur in sub-Saharan Africa each year, resulting in up to 500,000 envenomations, 25,000 deaths and another 25,000 permanent disabilities.

Because there is no reliable reporting system in place and because most victims never report their injury to health care facilities, these numbers are uncertain. One comprehensive study estimates that 91,000 to 420,000 snake envenomings occur in sub-Saharan Africa annually, resulting in anywhere from 4,000 to 30,000 deaths. The same study estimates that 3,000 to 80,000 envenomations occur in North Africa, although far fewer people, less than 100, die each year. The variability of these estimates is indicative of the difficulty in accurately assessing snakebite morbidity and mortality.

In sub-Saharan Africa, over 50% of snakebite injuries are not appropriately treated. Between 40 and 80% of victims, depending on the country, exclusively rely on traditional medicine for treatment. Most victims who receive treatment by health care professionals have nevertheless delayed seeking medical attention for over 24 hours, and often up to 1 to 2 weeks. In many sub-Saharan countries, poor availability of expensive antivenom contributes to morbidity, and snakebites continue to remain a neglected health problem.

== Asia ==
In Bangladesh, the incidence of snakebites is very high, like other tropical countries of Southeast Asia. Here most snakebite victims dwelling in rural areas are farmers, fishermen, and hunters and also there are a high number of snakebite occurrences that happened at their homes as most of the snakes are nocturnal animals and poor people have the practice of sleeping on the floor. An epidemiological study estimated about 8000 snakebites per year with 22% mortality which has been identified to be one of the highest in the world. Nonetheless, there are approximately 80 species of snakes found in Bangladesh; among them only few are venomous. These are cobra, krait, Russell's viper, sawscaled viper, green snakes, and sea snakes. However, most of the bites are reported by nonvenomous snakes and even as many as 40% bites inflicted by venomous snakes do not produce signs of envenoming.

On the Indian subcontinent, almost all snakebite deaths have traditionally been attributed to the Big Four, consisting of the Russell's viper, Indian cobra, saw-scaled viper, and the common krait. However, studies have shown that the hump-nosed viper, previously considered essentially harmless and misidentified as the saw-scaled viper, is capable of delivering a fatal bite. In regions of Kerala, India, it may be responsible for nearly 10% of venomous bites. Commonly used antivenoms in India do not appear to be effective against hump-nosed viper bites. According to the most conservative estimates, at least 81,000 snake envenomings and 11,000 fatalities occur in India each year, making it the most heavily affected country in the world. The Malayan pit viper and banded krait are two other species involved in a significant number of venomous bites.

In Myanmar (Burma), approximately 70 to 80% of bites are inflicted by the Russell's viper, which is frequently found in rice fields. In Japan, the majority of venomous bites are inflicted by the Asian pit vipers. In Sri Lanka, approximately 40% of bites are caused by the Russell's viper, while 35% are caused by the Indian cobra. In Thailand, the monocled cobra is responsible for the majority of snakebite fatalities. Tea plantations are sometimes associated with elapids such as the common cobras and the king cobra.

Reports of large man-eating pythons are common in Southeast Asia, although the threat is typically exaggerated. However, in the Philippines, more than a quarter of Aeta men (a modern forest-dwelling hunter-gatherer group) have reported surviving a reticulated python attack. Pythons are nonvenomous ambush predators, and both the Aeta and pythons hunt deer, wild pigs, and monkeys, making them competitors and prey.

Throughout Western Asia, the species responsible for the majority of bites tend to be more venomous than European snakes, but deaths are infrequent. Studies estimate that perhaps 100 fatal bites occur each year. The Palestine viper and Lebetine viper are the most important species. While larger and more venomous elapids, such as the Egyptian cobra, are also found throughout the Middle East, these species inflict fewer bites.

== Australasia ==
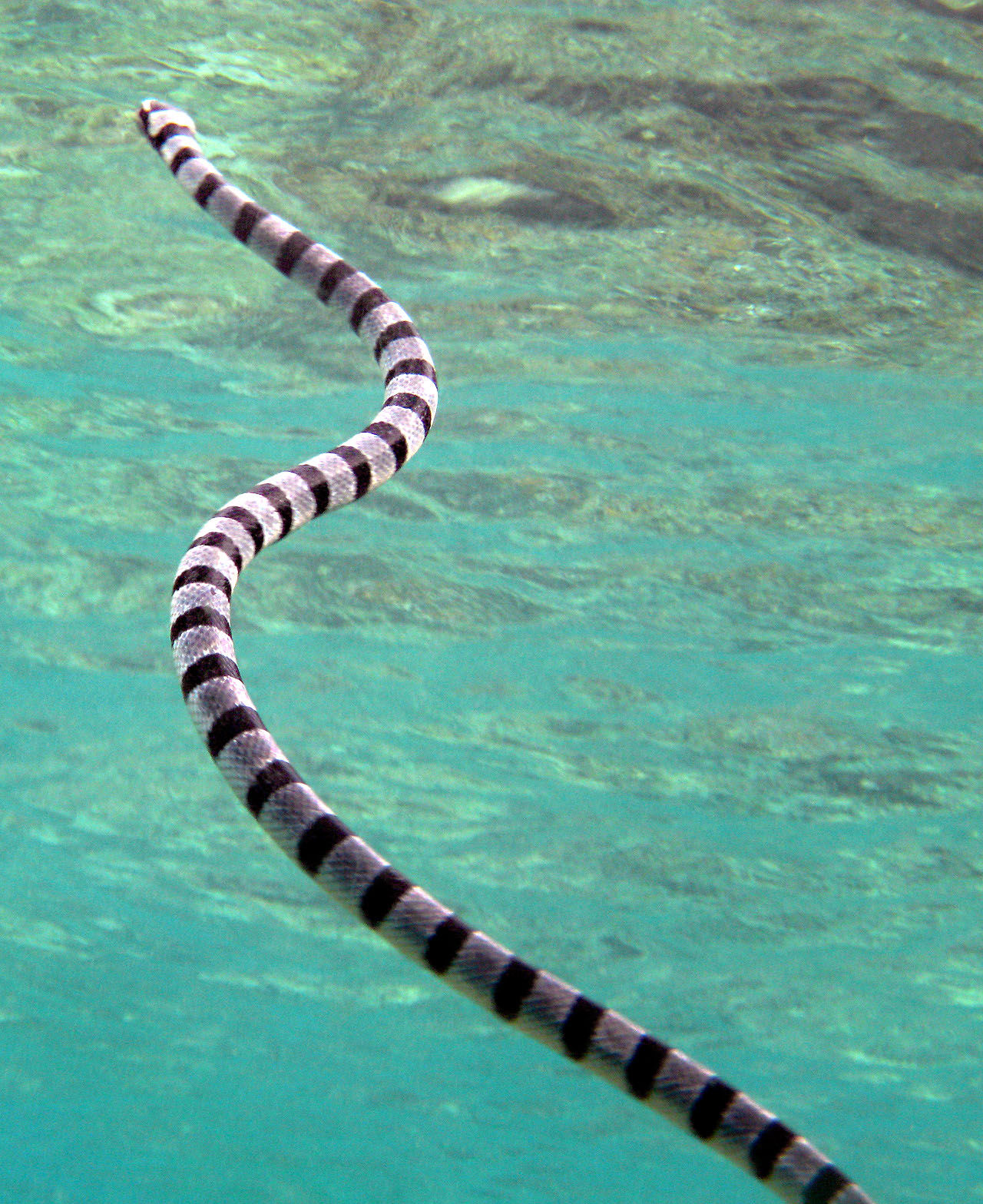
The yellow-lipped sea krait is a timid but highly venomous sea snake common throughout tropical Indo-Pacific waters.

The vast majority of venomous snakebites in Australasia occur outside of Australia, in the surrounding islands. At least 300 envenomations occur each year in Papua New Guinea, 30 in the Solomon Islands, and 10 Vanuatu. The majority of bites in New Guinea are caused by the death adders, and a smaller number by the endemic small-eyed snake and other local species. Most of the Pacific Islands are free of terrestrial snakes, although sea snakes are common in coral reefs. In the Oceanian realm, only Micronesia and Tonga, where at least 10 envenomations occur annually, face an appreciable burden of snakebite.

In Australia, there are many more annual cases of spiderbite and jellyfish envenomation than snakebite; however, when considering the number of fatal cases, snakebite is the most serious type of envenoming. Australia is unique in that it is the only continent where venomous snakes constitute the majority of species. Nearly all venomous species in Australia are elapids, as vipers are absent from the continent.

The brown snakes, death adders, mulga snakes, taipans, and tiger snakes are the five groups that inflict virtually all reported snakebites, although copperheads, rough-scaled snakes, and members of the genus Hoplocephalus are also occasionally involved in bites. Of the five dangerous groups, the highly venomous eastern brown snake, which is widespread and common in both rural and urban environments, is the most important—it is estimated to be responsible for up to 60% of all deaths caused by snakebite.

In Northern Australia, sea snakes are common and occasionally inflict bites, although far less frequently than terrestrial snakes. Several venomous colubrids exist in Australia as well, such as the brown tree snake, although they have geographically limited distributions and only very rarely deliver a medically significant bite. In Tasmania and Kangaroo Island, which have a cooler, moister habitat than mainland Australia, the tiger snakes and copperhead snakes inflict the majority of bites. The brown snakes are not present on these islands.

Despite the fact that many Australian snakes have unusually potent venom, wide access to antivenom, which is available for all dangerous species, has made deaths exceedingly rare. It is believed that up to 1,500 definite or suspected snakebites occur in Australia each year, of which about 200 are serious enough to warrant antivenom therapy. Approximately 2 to 4 fatalities occur annually.

== Europe ==
In Europe, nearly all of the snakes responsible for venomous bites belong to the viper family, and of these, the coastal viper, nose-horned viper, asp viper, and Lataste's viper inflict the majority of bites. Although Europe has a population of some 731 million people, snake bites are only responsible for between 1 and 7 (average of 4) fatalities each year, largely due to wide access to health care services and antivenom, as well as the relatively mild potency of many native species' venom.

Even in Europe, measurement of the prevalence and mortality due to venomous snakebite is challenging, and most figures are likely underestimates. The best estimate is that the annual incidence of snakebites in Europe (including European Russia and Turkey) is 1.06 [0.97–1.15] per 100,000 inhabitants, only about 15% of which are severe bites. The most detailed data on mortality are from France, where 36 people died from venomous snakebite between 1980 and 2008, an annual mortality of 0.0021 per 100,000 inhabitants.

Bites from captive venomous snakes to a very specific and limited population of amateur herpetoculturists, zookeepers, and researchers are an issue in Europe, challenging hospital workers with unexpected situations.

== North America ==
Of the 120 known indigenous snake species in North America, only 20 are venomous to human beings, all belonging to the families Viperidae and Elapidae. However, in the United States, every state except Maine, Alaska, and Hawaii is home to at least one of 20 venomous snake species. Up to 95% of all snakebite-related deaths in the United States are attributed to the western and eastern diamondback rattlesnakes. Further, the majority of bites in the United States occur in the southwestern part of the country, in part because rattlesnake populations in the eastern states are much lower.

The national average incidence of venomous snake bites in the United States is roughly 4 bites per 100,000 persons, and about 5 deaths per year total (1 death per 65 million people). The state of North Carolina has the highest frequency of reported snakebites, averaging approximately 19 bites per 100,000 persons. Fewer than 1% of venomous snakebites in the United States are caused by coral snakes, the rest being caused by the pit vipers (rattlesnakes, copperheads, and cottonmouths).

Mexico is estimated to have at least 28,000 snake envenomings annually, although only a small number of these lead to death. Central America is home to 23 species of pit vipers, and they inflict the vast majority of reported bites. Of these, Bothrops asper is the most important species, partly because it is abundant in lowland areas and partly because it is frequently found in agricultural and pastoral areas where humans work. Of the elapids, the yellow-bellied sea snake has, very rarely, caused venomous bites, while the coral snakes, although common, inflict only 1 to 2% of all reported snake bites. Of the coral snakes, Micrurus nigrocinctus is responsible for the most bites.

Colubrid species found in Central America only cause mild to moderate envenomation in healthy adults, and most of these bites have occurred in humans handling the snakes. Panama may have the greatest incidence of snakebites in Latin America, while El Salvador has the lowest (mostly because B. asper is not found in this country). The total number of snakebites in Central America is estimated to be 4,000 to 5,000, although as in other regions of the world, snakebites are probably underreported.

== South America ==
In the Neotropics, the lance-headed vipers inflict the majority of fatal bites, although of the many known species, only two, the common lancehead and terciopelo, are responsible for most fatalities. The tropical rattlesnake is another important species.

Venomous snakebite in Central and South America was reviewed extensively by Warrell. Estimates of the number of deaths resulting from venomous snakebite based on hospital and Ministry of Health data are underestimates and "notoriously inaccurate", ranging from 3,000-4,000 deaths estimated in 1954 to 5,000 deaths out of 300,000 bites in 1998. This is because most people in rural areas seek help of traditional shamans instead of modern hospitals. For example, 54% of patients admitted to hospitals for venomous snakebite in northwestern Colombia had already been treated by a shaman.

Although snakebite risk may be high, tourists and other visitors are rarely bitten. The risk to field biologists working in Central America is estimated at one bite per 500,000 hours of field work. Treatment with antivenom has reduced the mortality from e.g. tropical rattlesnake bites in Brazil from 72% to 12%.

Amazingly, data from anthropological studies suggest that although snakebite risk and death from snakebite are relatively high among forest-dwelling Amerindian groups (2-4% of all deaths depending on the group), the majority of members of some of these groups instead die in conflicts with other humans, either outsiders or other Amerindians.

== Oceans ==
Most of the Pacific Islands are free of terrestrial snakes; however, sea snakes are common in the Indian Ocean and tropical Pacific Ocean, but are not found in the Atlantic Ocean or the Caribbean, Mediterranean or Red Seas. While the majority of species live close to shorelines or coral reefs, the fully pelagic yellow-bellied sea snake can be found in the open ocean. Over 50% of bites inflicted by sea snakes, which are generally not aggressive, occur when fishermen attempt to remove snakes which have become tangled in fishing nets.

Symptoms may appear in as little as 5 minutes or take 8 hours to develop, depending on the species and region of the body bitten. Although sea snakes are known for extremely potent venom, about 80% of reported bites end up being dry. It is estimated that each year 15,000 to 75,000 fisherman are bitten by sea snakes. The advent of antivenom and advances in emergency medicine have reduced fatalities to about 3% of snakebite cases. The highly venomous beaked sea snake is responsible for more than 50% of all sea snake bites, as well as the majority of envenomings and fatalities.

== Gallery ==
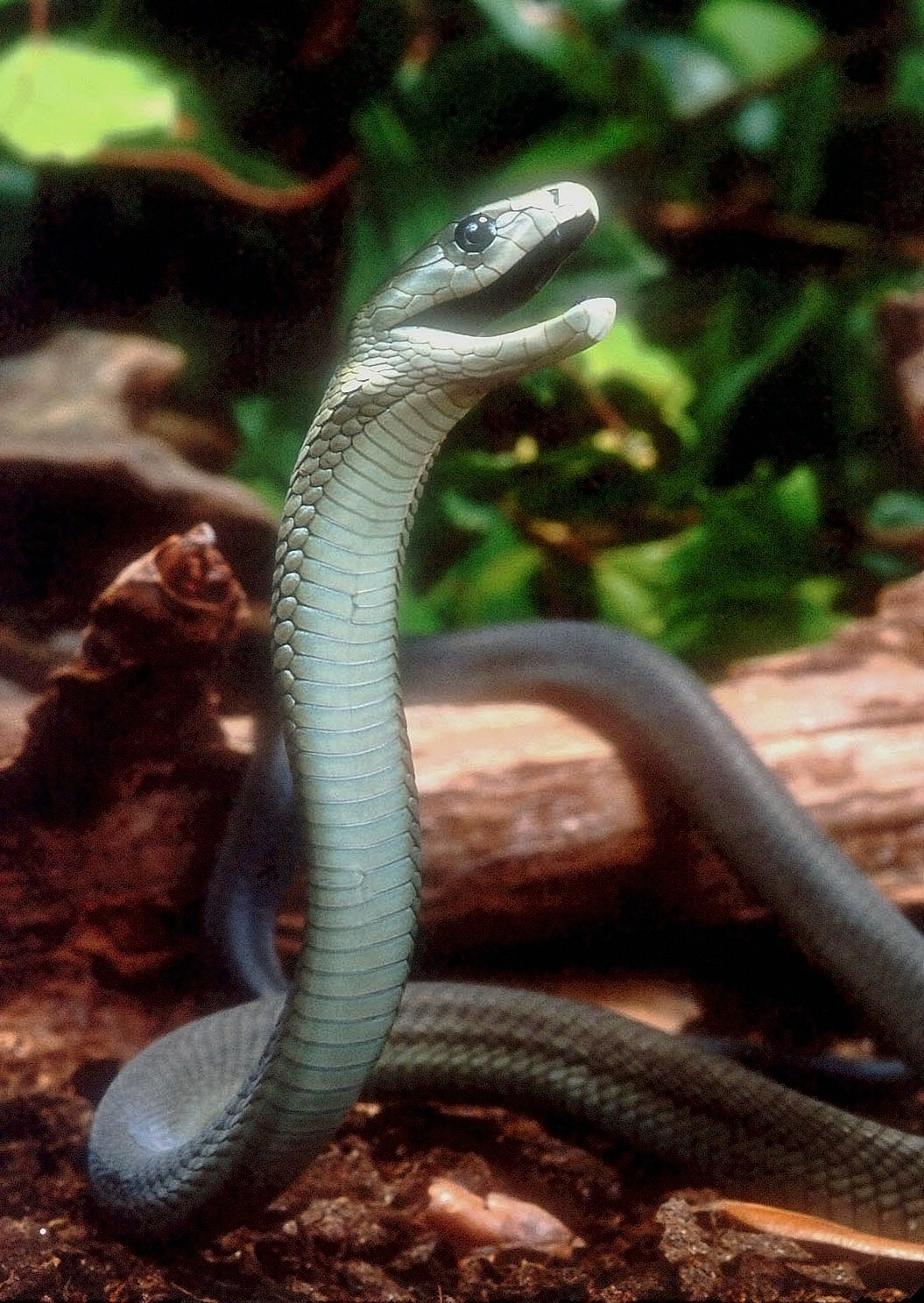
The black mamba is one of sub-Saharan Africa's most feared snakes. A territorial species that may become unusually aggressive if provoked. Without antivenom treatment, the mortality rate is 100%,

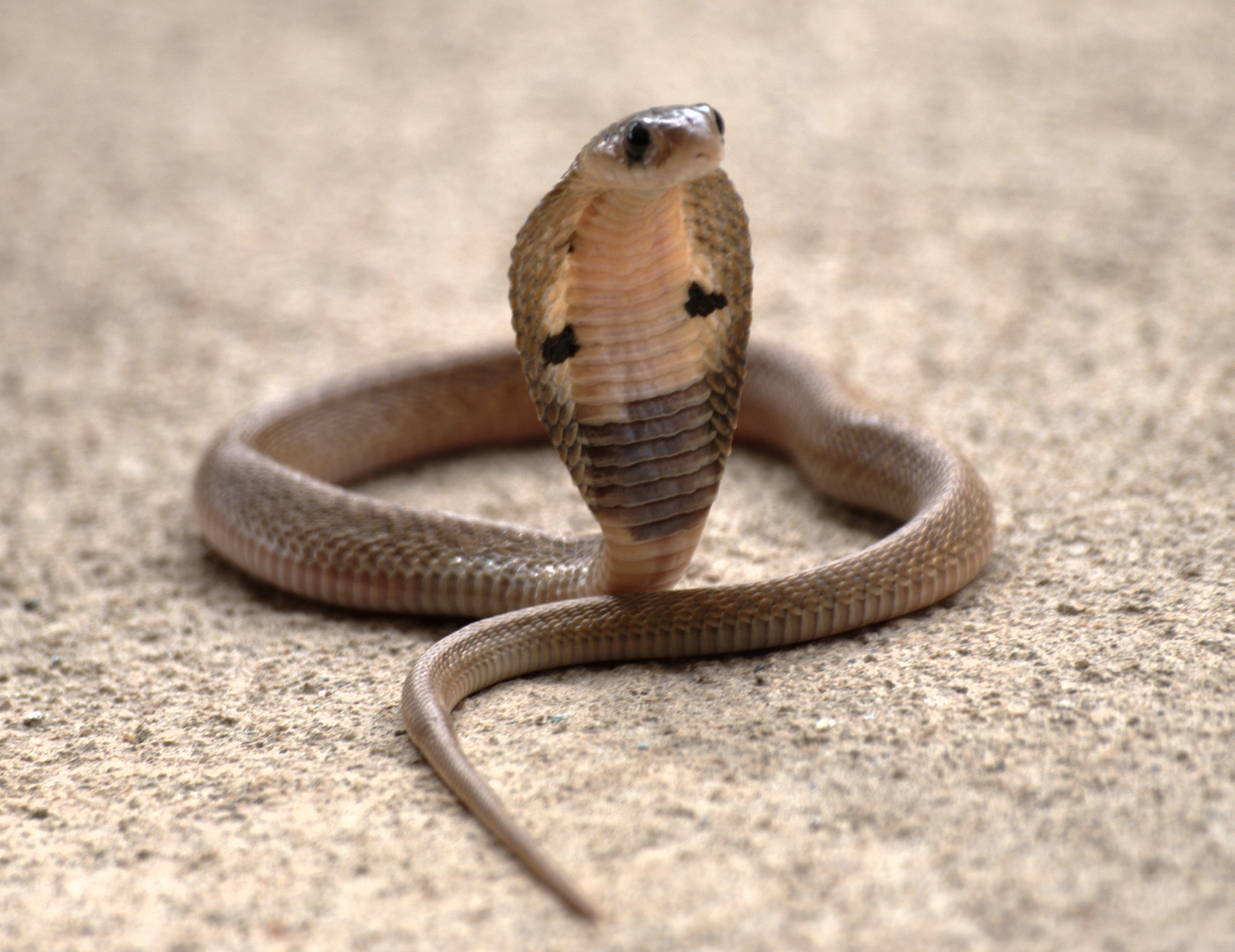
A juvenile Indian cobra, perhaps India's most recognized snake. This species is a member of the Big Four, a group of snakes traditionally held responsible for the majority of fatalities on the Indian subcontinent.

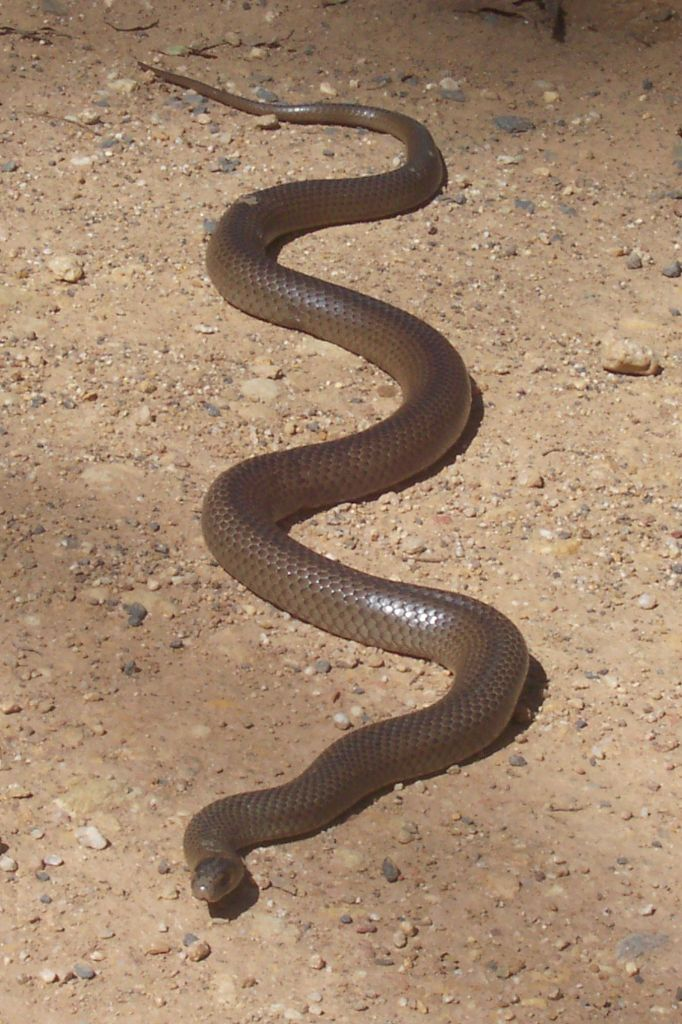
The widespread and common eastern brown snake is one of Australia's most venomous elapids. Fast moving and aggressive if threatened, it is responsible for more than half of the country's fatal bites.

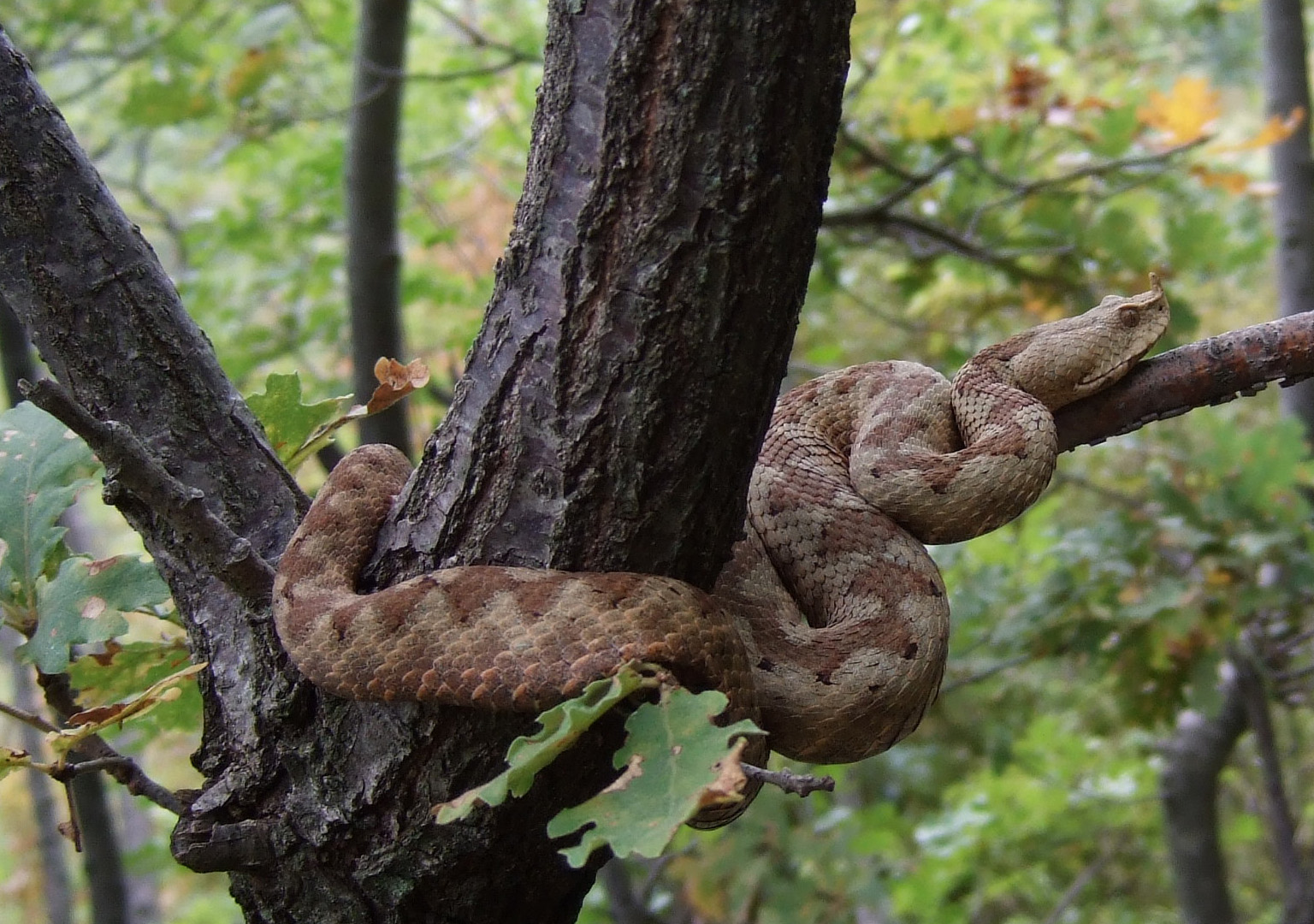
Although not a particularly aggressive species, the horned viper possesses the most potent venom of all European snakes. It is typically regarded as the continent's most dangerous snake.

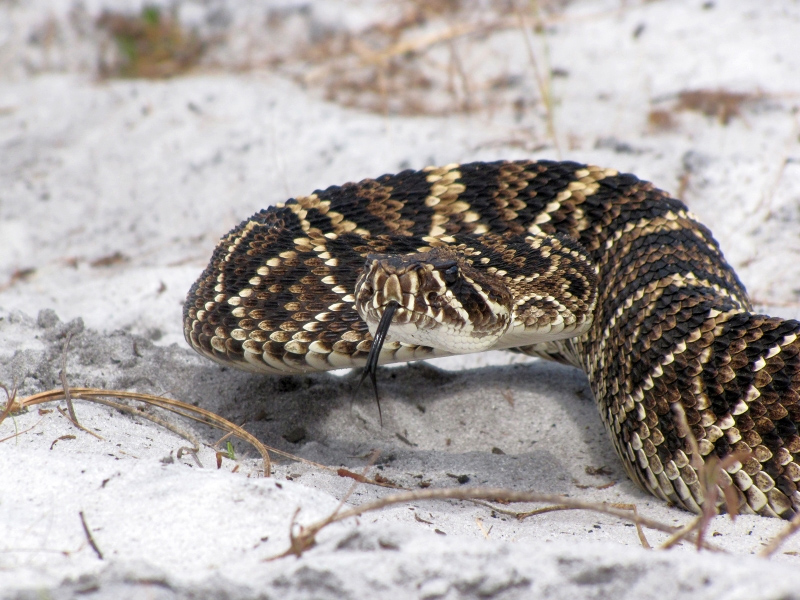
The highly venomous eastern diamondback rattlesnake is the largest rattlesnake species in the world. A large, heavy-bodied, and powerful pit viper, it is the leading cause of fatal snakebites in North America.

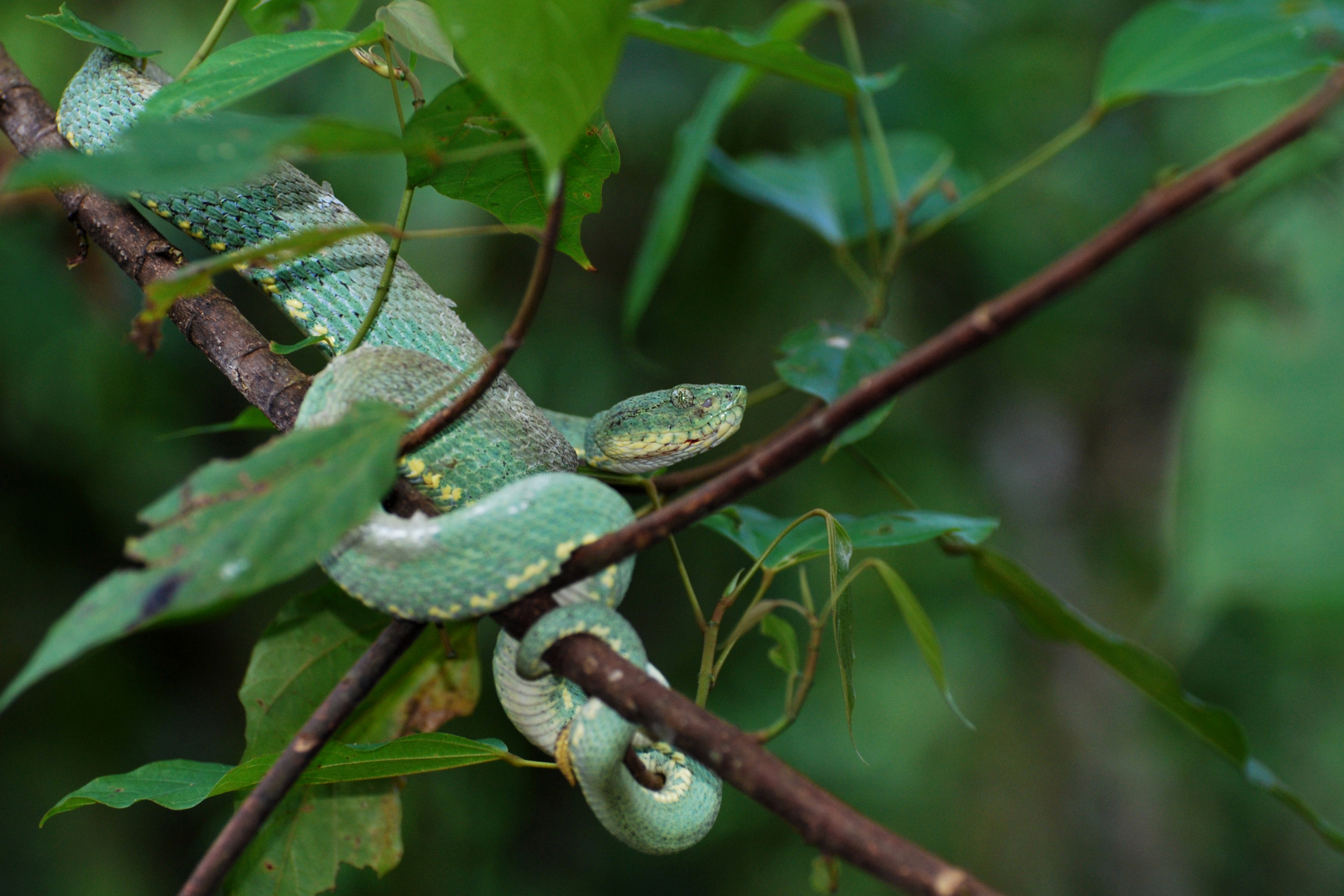
The two-striped forest pit viper is an arboreal snake from the Amazon Basin. An important cause of bites in its habitat, it may be the second most dangerous snake in the Amazon after the common lancehead.

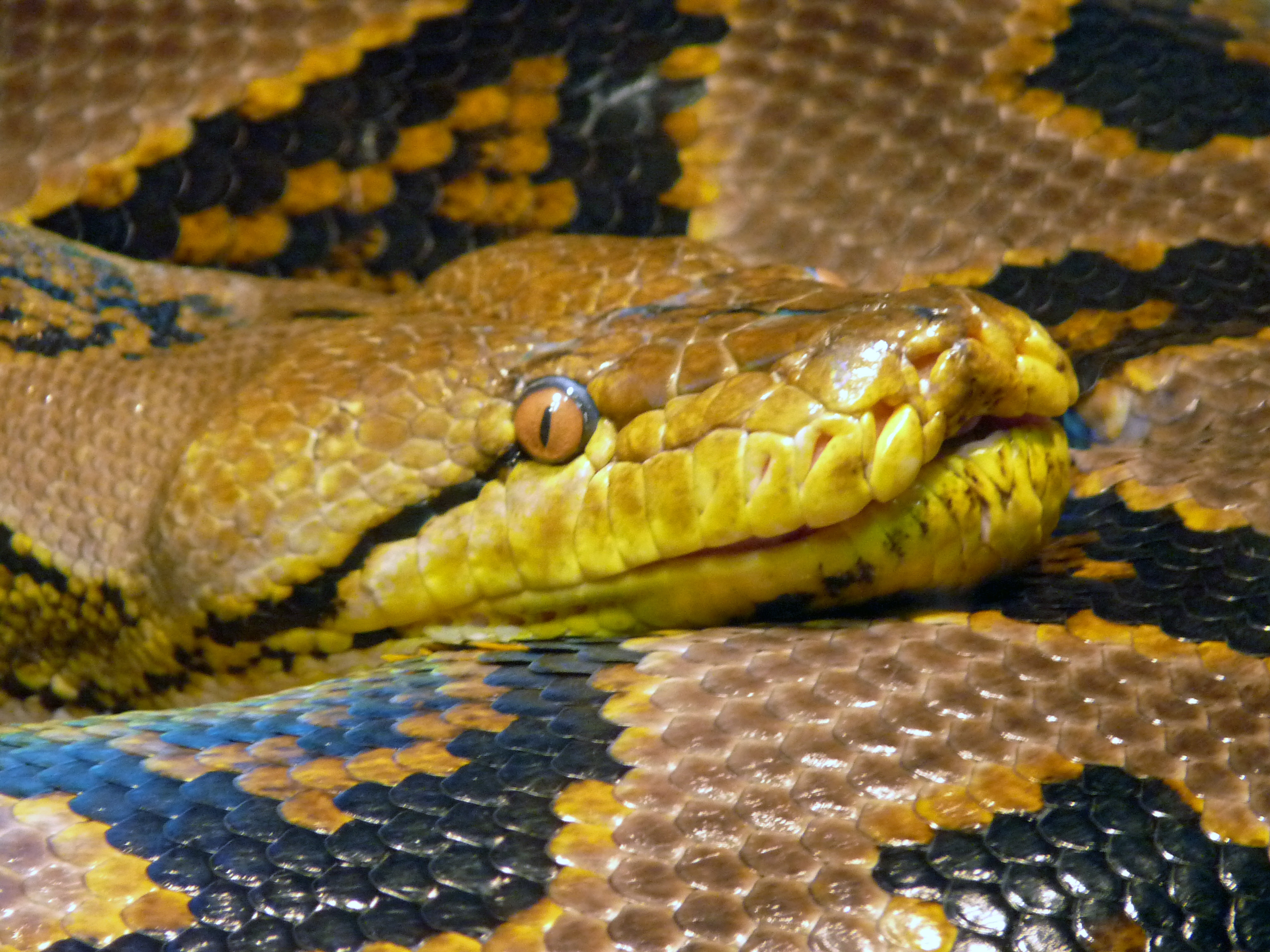
Southeast Asia's reticulated python, the world's largest snake, is a potentially dangerous species. More than a quarter of Aeta men (a Filipino hunter-gatherer group) have survived python predation attempts.
