= Alfred, Duke of Saxe-Coburg and Gotha =

Duke of Saxe-Coburg and Gotha from 1893 to 1900

Alfred
- Duke of Edinburgh
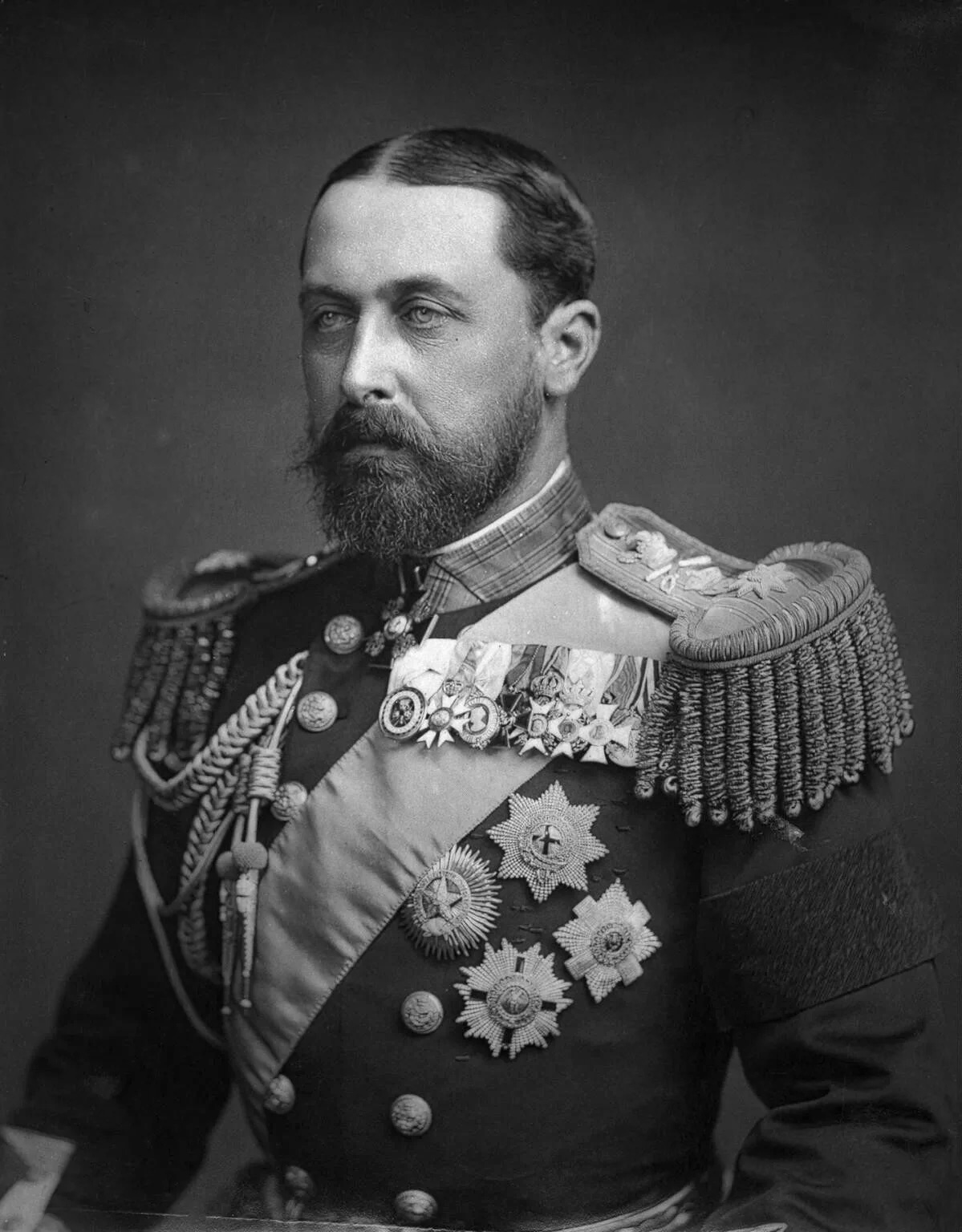
- Prince Alfred in 1881

Duke of Saxe-Coburg and Gotha
- Reign: 22 August 1893 – 30 July 1900
- Predecessor: Ernest II
- Successor: Charles Edward
- Born: 6 August 1844; Windsor Castle, Windsor, Berkshire, England
- Died: 30 July 1900 (aged 55); Schloss Rosenau, Coburg, Duchy of Saxe-Coburg and Gotha, German Empire
- Burial: 4 August 1900; Friedhof am Glockenberg, Coburg
- Spouse: Grand Duchess Maria Alexandrovna of Russia (m. 1874)
- Issue: Alfred, Hereditary Prince of Saxe-Coburg and Gotha; Marie, Queen of Romania; Grand Duchess Victoria Feodorovna of Russia; Alexandra, Princess of Hohenlohe-Langenburg; Princess Beatrice, Duchess of Galliera
Names
- Alfred Ernest Albert
- House: Saxe-Coburg and Gotha
- Father: Prince Albert of Saxe-Coburg and Gotha
- Mother: Queen Victoria
- Military career
- Allegiance: United Kingdom
- Branch: Royal Navy
- Rank: Admiral of the Fleet
- Commands: Commander-in-Chief, Plymouth; Mediterranean Fleet; Channel Fleet; Admiral Superintendent of Naval Reserves, Malta; HMS Galatea

Alfred (Alfred Ernest Albert; 6 August 1844 – 30 July 1900) was sovereign Duke of Saxe-Coburg and Gotha from 22 August 1893 until his death in 1900. He was the second son and fourth child of Queen Victoria and Prince Albert. He was known as the Duke of Edinburgh from 1866 until he succeeded his paternal uncle Ernest II as the reigning Duke of Saxe-Coburg and Gotha in the German Empire.

== Early life ==
Alfred was born at 7:50 am on 6 August 1844 at Windsor Castle to the reigning British monarch, Queen Victoria, and her husband, Prince Albert. Nicknamed Affie, he was second in the line of succession to the British throne behind his elder brother, Albert Edward, Prince of Wales.

Alfred was baptised on 6 September by William Howley, Archbishop of Canterbury, in the Private Chapel at Windsor Castle. His godparents were his mother's first cousin, Prince George of Cambridge (represented by his father, the Duke of Cambridge); his paternal aunt (by marriage), the Duchess of Saxe-Coburg and Gotha (represented by Alfred's maternal grandmother, the Duchess of Kent and Strathearn); and his maternal uncle, the 3rd Prince of Leiningen (represented by the Duke of Wellington).

Alfred remained second in line to the British throne from his birth until January 1864, when his elder brother Albert Edward and sister-in-law Alexandra had their first child, Prince Albert Victor. Alfred became third in line to the throne and, as Albert Edward and Alexandra continued to have children, Alfred was further demoted in the order of succession.

== Entering the Royal Navy ==
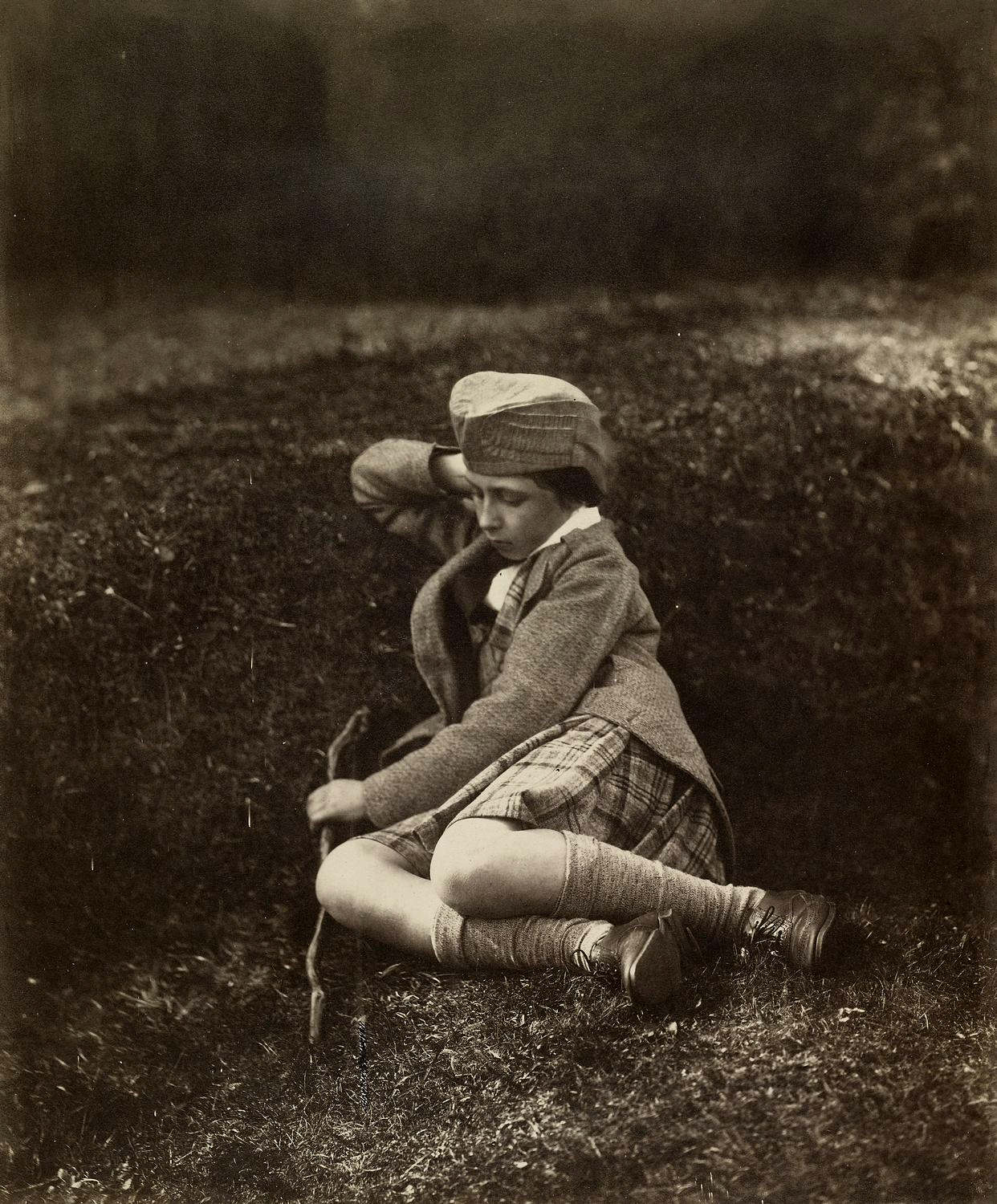
Alfred in 1856

In 1856, when he reached age 12, it was decided that Alfred, in accordance with his own wishes, should enter the Royal Navy. A separate establishment was assigned to him, with Lieutenant J.C. Cowell, RE, as governor. He passed a special entrance examination in July 1858, and was appointed as a naval cadet in HMS Euryalus at the age of 14.

In July 1860, while on this ship, Alfred paid an official visit to the Cape Colony, and made a very favourable impression both on the colonials and on the native chiefs. He took part in a hunt at Hartebeeste-Hoek, resulting in the slaughter of large numbers of game animals.

Following the expulsion of King Otto of Greece in 1862, Alfred was chosen to succeed him, but the British government blocked plans for him to ascend the Greek throne, largely because of the Queen's opposition to the idea. She and her late husband had made plans for him to succeed to the Duchy of Saxe-Coburg. Even without Victoria's objections, the London Conference of 1832 had barred any member of the Great Powers' royal houses from accepting the Greek crown.

Alfred remained in the navy, and was promoted to lieutenant on 24 February 1863, serving under his half-cousin Count Gleichen on the corvette HMS Racoon. Gleichen's son recalled his father as saying that "the Prince, although shaping well as a sailor, was of a somewhat wayward disposition at that period, and his high spirits more than once led him into minor troubles with the authorities." He was promoted to captain on 23 February 1866 and was appointed to the command of the frigate HMS Galatea in January 1867. Lord Charles Beresford described him as having "a great natural ability for handling a fleet" and noted that he "would have made a first-class fighting admiral."

== Duke of Edinburgh ==
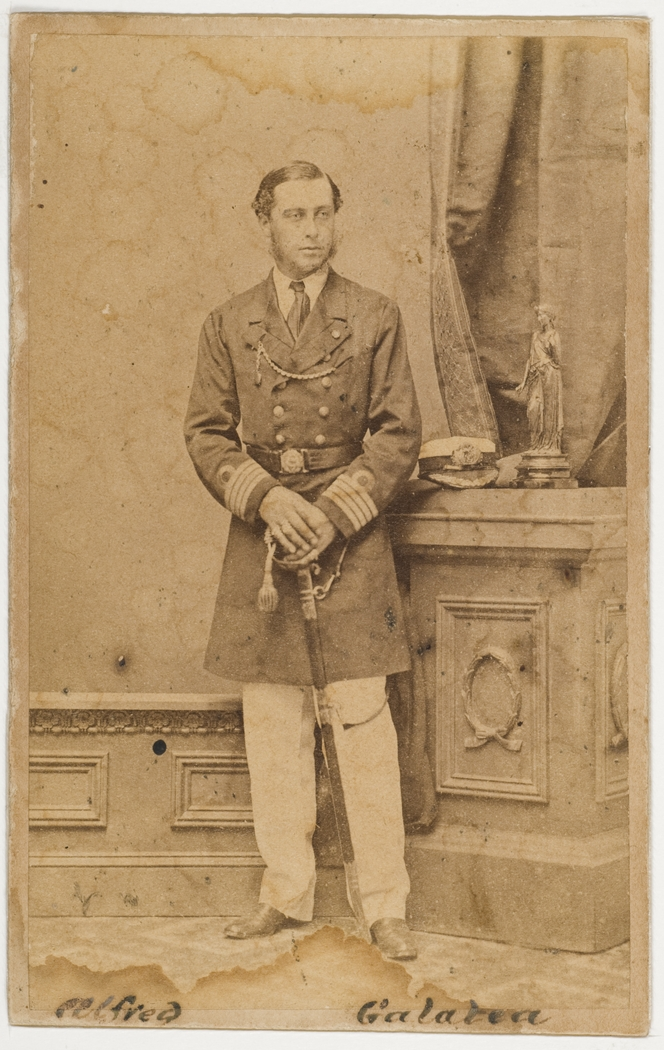
Duke of Edinburgh, Alfred Ernest Albert, Sydney, ca. 1868, by Montagu Scott

In the Queen's Birthday Honours on 24 May 1866, Alfred was created Duke of Edinburgh, Earl of Ulster, and Earl of Kent with an annuity of £15,000 granted by Parliament in the Annuity, Duke of Edinburgh Act 1866 (29 & 30 Vict. c. 8). He took his seat in the House of Lords on 8 June.

While still in command of the Galatea, the Duke of Edinburgh started from Plymouth on 24 January 1867 for his voyage around the world. On 7 June 1867, he left Gibraltar, reached the Cape of Good Hope on 24 July, on 5 August 1867 the island of Tristan da Cunha, and paid a royal visit to Cape Town on 24 August 1867 after landing at Simon's Town a while earlier. He landed at Glenelg, South Australia, on 31 October 1867.

Being the first member of the royal family to visit Australia, Alfred was received with great enthusiasm. During his stay of nearly five months he visited Adelaide, Melbourne, Sydney, Brisbane and Tasmania. Several institutions, including Prince Alfred College, The Alfred Hospital, and Royal Prince Alfred Hospital were named in his honour.

On 12 March 1868, on his second visit to Sydney, Alfred was invited by Sir William Manning, President of the Sydney Sailors' Home, to picnic at the beachfront suburb of Clontarf to raise funds for the home. At the function, he was wounded in the back by a revolver fired by Henry James O'Farrell. The shot, fired at point-blank range, ricocheted off one of the metal clips on Alfred's trouser braces, narrowly missing his spine. He was tended to for the next two weeks by six nurses, trained by Florence Nightingale and led by Matron Lucy Osburn, who had just arrived in Australia in February 1868.

In the violent struggle during which Alfred was shot, William Vial had managed to wrest the gun away from O'Farrell until bystanders assisted. Vial, a master of a Masonic Lodge, had helped to organise the picnic in honour of the Duke's visit and was presented with a gold watch for securing Alfred's life. Another bystander, George Thorne, was wounded in the foot by O'Farrell's second shot. O'Farrell was arrested at the scene, quickly tried, convicted and hanged on 21 April 1868.

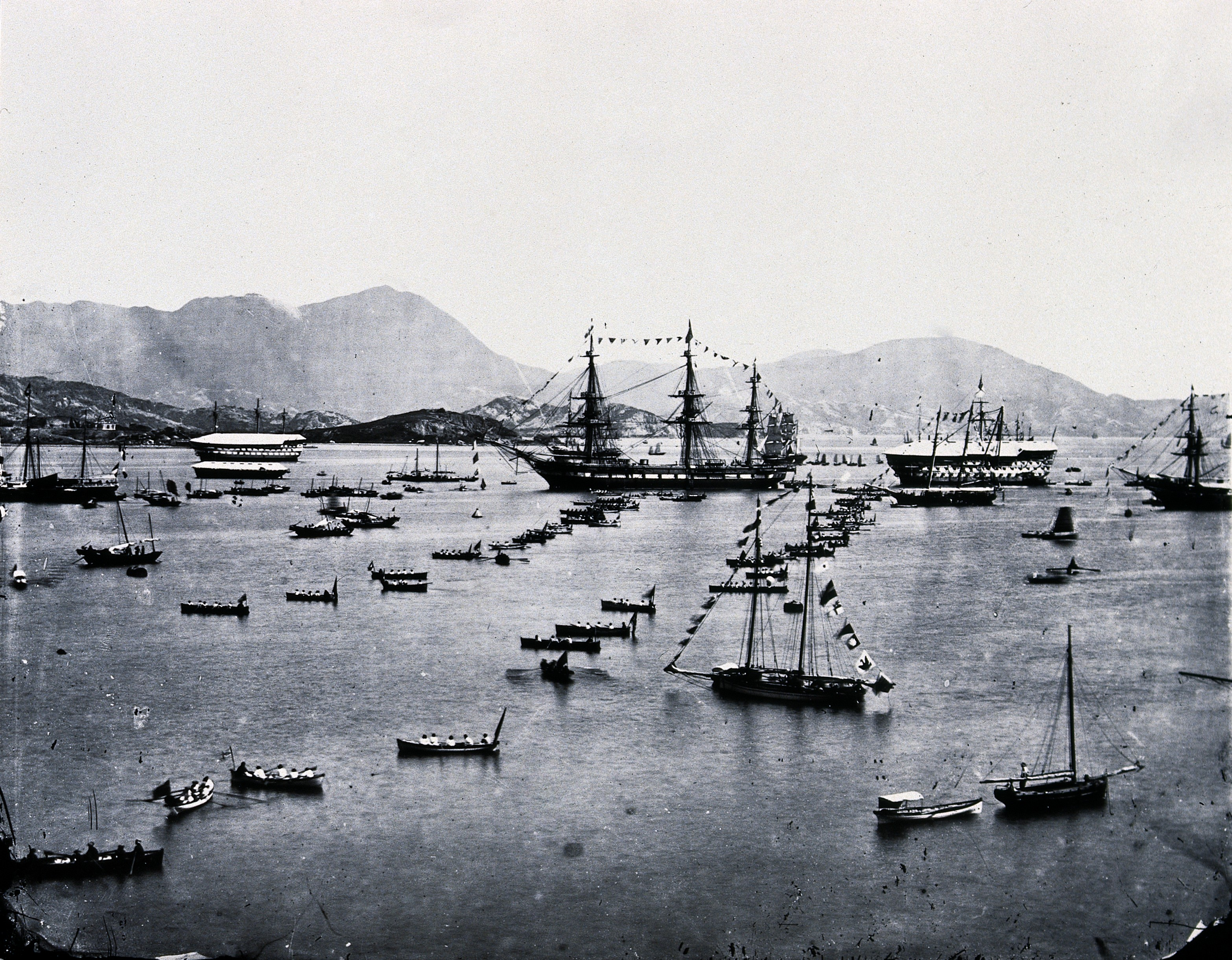
The arrival of HMS Galatea carrying Alfred. Victoria Harbour, Hong Kong, 1869.

On the evening of 23 March 1868, the most influential people of Sydney voted for a memorial building to be erected, "to raise a permanent and substantial monument in testimony of the heartfelt gratitude of the community at the recovery of HRH". This led to a public subscription which paid for the construction of Royal Prince Alfred Hospital.

Alfred soon recovered from his injury and was able to resume command of his ship and return home in early April 1868. He reached Spithead on 26 June 1868, after an absence of seventeen months.

Alfred visited Hawaii in 1869 and spent time with the royal family there, where he was presented with leis upon his arrival. He was also the first member of the royal family to visit New Zealand, arriving in 1869 on HMS Galatea, where he spent a month living in Pakuranga. He also became the first European prince to visit Japan and on 4 September 1869, he was received at an audience by the teenaged Emperor Meiji in Tokyo.

The Duke's next voyage was to India, where he arrived in December 1869, and Ceylon (now Sri Lanka), which he visited the following year. In both countries and at Hong Kong, which he visited on the way, he was the first British prince to set foot in the country. In Ceylon a reception was given for him, by the request of the British, by Charles Henry de Soysa, the richest man in Ceylon, at his private residence which was consequently renamed, by permission, Alfred House. Alfred reportedly ate off gold plates with gold cutlery inlaid with jewels.

== Potential matches ==
In 1862, Queen Victoria wrote to Victoria, Princess Royal, that she wanted Alfred to marry Princess Dagmar of Denmark. She wrote: "I hear that the Emperor of Russia has not given up his intention of asking for Alix or Dagmar for his son. I should be very sorry if any thing were decided for Dagmar before you had seen her, as it would be one chance less for Affie." However, she decided against the match because of Germany's anger towards Denmark over the disputed territories of Schleswig-Holstein, especially since Alfred was the heir to Coburg. She wrote to Princess Victoria: "Respecting Dagmar, I do not wish her to be kept for Affie. Let the Emperor have her."

Dagmar was initially engaged to Tsarevich Nicholas; however, he died on 22 April 1865 in the presence of his parents, brothers, and Dagmar. His last wish was that Dagmar would marry his younger brother, the future Alexander III. Alexander and Dagmar did marry; therefore, she became Empress of Russia.

The Queen considered Grand Duchess Olga Constantinovna of Russia as a potential wife for Alfred. She wrote to Princess Victoria, "It is a great pity that Sanny's charming daughter is a Greek [Orthodox]– she would do so well". In 1867, Queen Victoria told Victoria, Princess Royal that "I had thought and hoped at one time for dear little Olga, who is now to marry King George".

== Marriage ==
During a visit to his sister Alice in August 1868, Alfred met Grand Duchess Maria Alexandrovna of Russia, then fourteen years old. Princess Alice was married to Maria Alexandrovna's first cousin. The Grand Duchess was visiting her maternal relatives, the Princes of Battenberg, at Jugenheim.

On 23 January 1874, the Duke of Edinburgh married Maria Alexandrovna, the second (and only surviving) daughter of Emperor Alexander II of Russia and his first wife Princess Marie of Hesse and by Rhine, daughter of Louis II, Grand Duke of Hesse and by Rhine and Princess Wilhelmine of Baden, at the Winter Palace, St Petersburg. To commemorate the occasion, the English bakery Peek Freans made the now internationally popular Marie biscuit, with the Duchess' name imprinted on its top.

The Duke and Duchess of Edinburgh made their public entry into London on 12 March. The marriage, however, was not a happy one, and the bride was thought haughty by London Society. She was surprised to discover that she had to yield precedence to the Princess of Wales and all of Queen Victoria's daughters and demanded that she take precedence before the Princess of Wales (the future Queen Alexandra) because she considered the Princess of Wales's family (the Danish royal family) to be inferior to her own. Queen Victoria refused this demand, yet granted her precedence immediately after the Princess of Wales.

=== Financial settlement ===
Affie had been granted an annuity of £15,000 from the British Civil list in 1866, which was increased by £10,000 to £25,000 when he married. Under the terms of the marriage treaty signed between the United Kingdom and Russian Empire, Maria would receive an annuity of £6,000 from the British Civil List if she outlived Alfred. Maria's father, Emperor Alexander II of Russia, also provided his daughter with a generous financial settlement, which included:

- 1,000,000 roubles (approximately £150,000), as fixed by the fundamental laws of the Russian Empire for the daughters of emperors. The capital was to remain deposited in Russia with the Department of Appanages, paying an income of 5% (50,000 roubles, or about £7,500);
- An additional 75,000 roubles (approximately £11,300) per annum, as a mark of the Emperor's "particular affection, which is not to be considered a precedent for the future";
- A special marriage portion of 1,000,000 roubles (£150,000), with the capital also remaining in Russia, paying an income of 5% annually (50,000 roubles, or about £7,500, paid half-yearly); and
- Maria was also to retain control of her private capital of 600,000 roubles (£90,000).

Consequently, the couple's income at the time of their marriage was approximately £51,500 annually, exclusive of Maria's private 600,000-rouble fortune. By the early 20th century fluctuations in the exchange rate between the Russian Rouble and British Pound had reduced Maria's 170,000-rouble Russian annuity to the equivalent of approximately £17,500.

The marriage treaty also specified that Maria was at liberty to make any contribution to the couple's household expenses as she pleased, but that the debts and obligations of their household would not be common to them both. If Maria predeceased Alfred leaving children, her marriage portion and private fortune would be appropriated for their benefit. If she predeceased him without children, Alfred would receive a lump sum of 250,000 roubles (£75,000) from the 'ordinary' marriage settlement, and would enjoy from the remaining portion of the ordinary settlement during his lifetime, after which it would revert to the Emperor of Russia. The "special" marriage portion would revert to the Emperor immediately if there were no children.

== Flag rank ==
Alfred was stationed in Malta for several years and his third child, Victoria Melita, was born there in 1876. Alfred's last command prior to promotion to flag rank would be as captain of HMS Black Prince in 1878, when he represented the Crown during the installation of John Campbell, Marquess of Lorne, as Governor General of Canada. Alfred was subsequently promoted rear-admiral upon his return to London and relief on 30 December 1878, becoming admiral superintendent of naval reserves, raising his flag aboard the corvette HMS Penelope in November 1879. Promoted to vice-admiral on 10 November 1882, he was given command of the Channel Squadron, with his flag aboard the armoured ship HMS Minotaur, in December 1883. He became Commander-in-Chief, Mediterranean Fleet, with his flag aboard the armoured ship HMS Alexandra, in March 1886, and having been promoted to admiral on 18 October 1887, he went on to be Commander-in-Chief, Plymouth in August 1890. He was promoted to Admiral of the Fleet on 3 June 1893.

Percy Scott wrote in his memoirs that "as a Commander-in-Chief, the Duke of Edinburgh had, in my humble opinion, no equal. He handled a fleet magnificently, and introduced many improvement in signals and manoeuvring." He "took a great interest in gunnery." "The prettiest ship I have ever seen was the [Duke of Edinburgh's flagship] HMS Alexandra. I was informed that £2,000 had been spent by the officers on her decoration."

Alfred was very fond of music and took a prominent part in establishing the Royal College of Music, created in 1882. He was a keen violinist, but had little skill. At a dinner party given by one of his brothers, he was persuaded to play. Sir Henry Ponsonby wrote: 'Fiddle out of tune and noise abominable.'

== Duke of Saxe-Coburg and Gotha ==
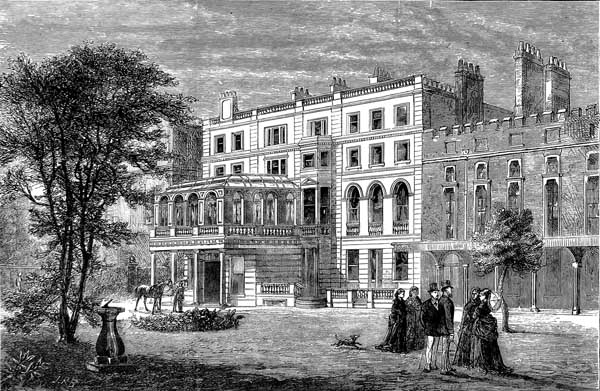
Clarence House, St James's, in 1874, the Duke's London residence

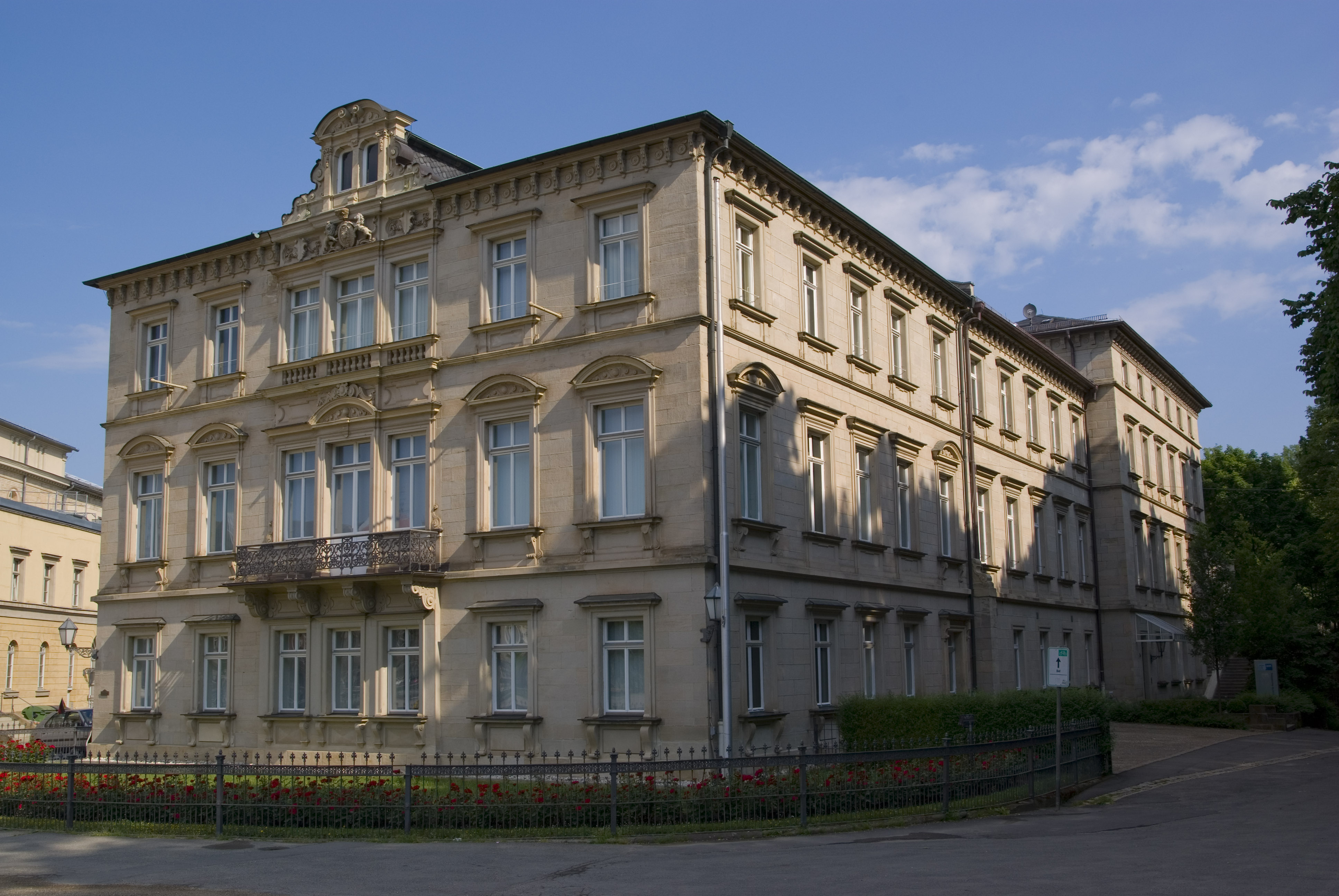
Palais Edinburgh, Coburg, the family's residence in Coburg from 1889 until Alfred's accession as Duke of Coburg in 1893

On the death of his uncle, Ernest II, Duke of Saxe-Coburg and Gotha, on 22 August 1893, the duchy fell to the Duke of Edinburgh since his elder brother, the Prince of Wales, had renounced his right to the succession before he married. As the heir-presumptive of his childless Uncle Duke Ernest II, Alfred and his wife had moved their family to Coburg in 1889, where they had previously purchased a large town mansion, the Palais Edinburgh. The Palais Edinburgh was situated in Coburg's town square, across from the Palace of the Dukes of Coburg, Schloss Ehrenburg.

Alfred thereupon surrendered his British allowance of £15,000 a year and his seats in the House of Lords and the Privy Council, but he retained the £10,000 granted on his marriage to maintain Clarence House as his London residence; he also came into receipt of the Coburg Crown Revenues, when then amounted to the equivalent of £46,000 a year. At first regarded with some coldness in the Duchy as a "foreigner", he gradually gained popularity. By the time of his death in 1900, he had generally won the good opinion of his subjects.

Alfred and Maria's only son, Alfred, Hereditary Prince of Saxe-Coburg and Gotha, became involved in a scandal involving his mistress and apparently shot himself in January 1899, in the midst of his parents' twenty-fifth wedding anniversary celebrations at the Schloss Friedenstein in Gotha. He survived, and his embarrassed mother sent him off to Meran to recover. However, he died there two weeks later, on 6 February. His father was devastated.

== Death ==
Alfred died of throat cancer on 30 July 1900, aged 55, at a lodge adjacent to Schloss Rosenau, the ducal summer residence just north of Coburg. He was buried at the ducal family's mausoleum in the Friedhof am Glockenberg in Coburg. As his younger brother, Prince Arthur, Duke of Connaught and Strathearn and nephew Prince Arthur, had renounced their succession rights to the ducal throne, Alfred was succeeded by his nephew, Prince Charles Edward, Duke of Albany (1884–1954), the posthumous son of his youngest brother, Prince Leopold, Duke of Albany.

He was survived by his mother, Victoria, who had already outlived two of her children, Alice and Leopold. She died six months later. Victoria dedicated a memorial in the form of a Celtic cross to Alfred in the grounds of Balmoral Castle which was erected shortly before her death.

Alfred was a keen collector of glass and ceramic ware, and after his death his widow gave his collection, valued at half a million marks, to the Veste Coburg, the enormous fortress on a hill top above Coburg.

== Legacy ==
=== Australia ===
Royal Prince Alfred Hospital in Sydney, The Alfred Hospital in Melbourne, Prince Alfred College in Adelaide, Prince Alfred Park in Sydney, Prince Alfred Square in Parramatta, and the Royal Prince Alfred Yacht Club, now in the Sydney suburb of Newport, are named in his honour.

The Alfred Hall in Ballarat was built in 1867 for his visit, and one of the city's suburbs was renamed Alfredton. Many streets, avenues, roads, halls, parks and schools bear his name in other parts of Australia. He laid the corner stones of new town halls in the two biggest cities, Sydney and Melbourne, and those buildings continue in use today.

=== Barbados ===
Prince Alfred Street in Bridgetown, the capital of Barbados, was named in his honour. It begins at the junction with Chapel Street and proceeds southward until reaching a car park along the Constitution river in the vicinity of the former James Fort.

=== Canada ===
Prince Alfred Bay, Nunavut, was named in his honour, as was Cape Prince Alfred in the North West Territories. Two islands in Ontario are named for Prince Alfred, one in the St Lawrence River near Brockville, and the other in Lake Nipigon north of Thunder Bay. The Prince Alfred Arch, a monument in Tangier, Nova Scotia, marks the spot Prince Alfred visited in 1861.

=== New Zealand ===
The name of the small township of Alfredton (near Eketāhuna in the lower North Island of New Zealand) honours the Prince. Alfred Street in central Auckland was named in his honour. The Bay of Plenty settlement of Galatea is named after his ship. Mt Alfred in Wellington – adjacent to Mount Victoria named after his mother and Mt Albert after his father – is named after him.

=== South Africa ===
Prince Alfred sailed into Port Elizabeth on 6 August 1860 as a midshipman on HMS Euryalus and celebrated his 16th birthday among its citizens. Seven years later he sailed into Simon's Town as the Captain of HMS Galatea. In Port Elizabeth there is a Prince Alfred's Terrace. The Alfred Rowing Club was established in 1864 and was housed under the pier at Table Bay. It was named after Prince Alfred, Duke of Edinburgh, who visited the Cape in 1860. It is the oldest organised sporting club in South Africa. The opening ceremony of the South African Library was performed by Prince Alfred in 1860. An impressive portrait of the Prince hangs in the main reading room.

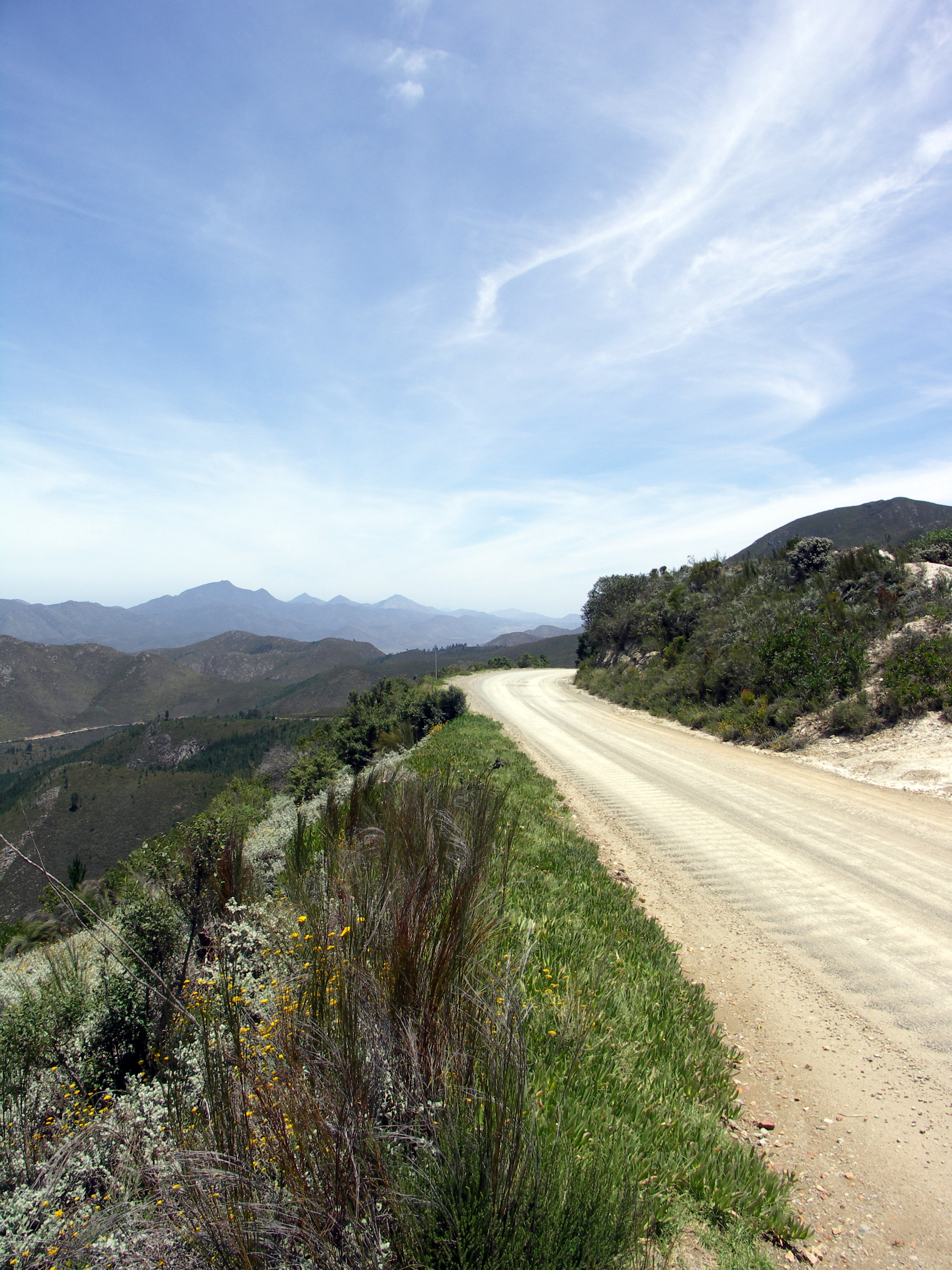
Prince Alfred Pass in the Western Cape, South Africa

Port Alfred, on the Kowie River in the Eastern Cape, was originally known as Port Frances after the daughter-in-law of the Governor of Cape Colony, Lord Charles Somerset. There is a pass named after Prince Alfred built by Andrew Geddes Bain and his son, Thomas, containing a lot of natural scenery.

In Simon's Town, the Prince Alfred Hotel was built in 1802 and renamed after the prince visited Cape Province in 1868. For more than two centuries Simon's Town has been an important naval base and harbour (first for the Royal Navy and now the South African Navy). The former hotel now houses the Backpackers' Hostel, opposite the harbour in the main street. In Cape Town during his visit in 1868, Prince Alfred ceremonially tipped the first load of rock to commence the building of the Breakwater. This was built by convict labour and formed the protective seawall for the new Cape Town Harbour, now redeveloped as the Victoria & Alfred Waterfront and a popular tourist and shopping destination.

A Prince Alfred Street can be found in Pietermaritzburg, Queenstown, Grahamstown and Caledon. The Port Elizabeth Chapter of the Memorable Order of Tin Hats, a veterans association, is known as the Prince Alfred Shellhole. Prince Alfred Hamlet, a small town in the Western Cape province, is named after Alfred.

=== United Kingdom ===
One of the stamp collectors in the British royal family, Prince Alfred won election as honorary president of The Philatelic Society, London in 1890. He may have inspired his nephew George V, who benefited after the Prince of Wales (later Edward VII) bought his brother Prince Alfred's collection. The merging of Alfred's and George's collections gave birth to the Royal Philatelic Collection.

=== Others ===
Edinburgh of the Seven Seas, the settlement on Tristan da Cunha, a British Overseas territory, was named after Alfred after he visited the remote islands in 1867 while Duke of Edinburgh.

Manta alfredi is commonly known as Prince Alfred's manta ray.

== Honours and arms ==
=== Honours ===
==== National honours ====
- Saxe-Coburg and Gotha: Co-Sovereign Knight Grand Cross of the Order of the Saxe-Ernstine, June 1863; Joint Grand Master, 22 August 1893
- KG: Royal Knight Companion of the Garter, 10 June 1863
- KT: Extra Knight of the Thistle, 15 October 1864
- KP: Knight of St. Patrick, 14 May 1880
- GCB: Knight Grand Cross of the Bath (military), 25 May 1889
- GCSI: Knight Grand Commander of the Star of India, 7 February 1870
- GCMG: Knight Grand Cross of St Michael and St George, 29 June 1869
- GCIE: Knight Grand Commander of the Indian Empire, 21 June 1887
- GCVO: Knight Grand Cross of the Royal Victorian Order, 24 May 1899
- PC: Privy Counsellor, 1866–1893
- KStJ: Knight of Justice of St. John, 27 March 1896
- ADC: Personal aide-de-camp to Queen Victoria, 9 December 1882

==== Foreign honours ====
- Kingdom of Portugal:
  - Grand Cross of the Tower and Sword, 25 November 1858
  - Grand Cross of the Sash of the Two Orders, 7 November 1889; Three Orders, 28 February 1894
- Belgium: Grand Cordon of the Order of Leopold (military), 15 August 1863
- Saxe-Weimar-Eisenach: Grand Cross of the White Falcon, 4 May 1864
- Kingdom of Prussia:
  - Knight of the Black Eagle, 7 May 1864; with Collar, 1883
  - Grand Commander's Cross of the Royal House Order of Hohenzollern, 5 December 1878
  - Knight of Justice of the Johanniter Order, 1883
- Grand Duchy of Hesse:
  - Grand Cross of the Ludwig Order, 15 May 1864
  - Grand Cross of the Merit Order of Philip the Magnanimous, with Swords, 6 June 1865
  - Knight of the Golden Lion, with Collar, 12 January 1894
- Russian Empire:
  - Knight of St. Andrew, May 1865
  - Knight of St. Alexander Nevsky, May 1865
  - Knight of the White Eagle, May 1865
  - Knight of St. Anna, 1st Class, May 1865
  - Knight of St. Stanislaus, 1st Class, May 1865
- Nassau: Knight of the Gold Lion of Nassau, July 1865
- Kingdom of Hawaii: Grand Cross of the Order of Kamehameha I, 1865
- Baden:
  - Knight of the House Order of Fidelity, 1865
  - Grand Cross of the Zähringer Lion, 1865
- French Empire: Grand Cross of the Legion of Honour, June 1867
- Empire of Brazil: Grand Cross of the Southern Cross, 15 July 1867
- Kingdom of Saxony: Knight of the Rue Crown, 15 July 1867
- Mecklenburg: Grand Cross of the Wendish Crown, with Crown in Ore and Diamonds, 28 June 1868
- (Austrian Empire) (Kingdom of Hungary) Austria-Hungary: Grand Cross of the Royal Hungarian Order of St. Stephen, 1874
- Denmark: Knight of the Elephant, 4 July 1875
- Principality of Serbia: Grand Cross of the Cross of Takovo
- Sweden-Norway: Knight of the Seraphim, 24 May 1881
- Netherlands: Grand Cross of the Netherlands Lion, 1 May 1882
- Württemberg: Grand Cross of the Württemberg Crown, 1883
- Ottoman Empire: Order of Osmanieh, Special Class in Diamonds, 1886
- Kingdom of Italy:
  - Knight of the Annunciation, 8 June 1887
  - Grand Cross of Saints Maurice and Lazarus, 8 June 1887
- Spain:
  - Grand Cross of the Order of Charles III, 9 July 1887
  - Knight of the Golden Fleece, 17 June 1888

=== Arms ===
Prince Alfred gained use of the royal arms of the United Kingdom, charged with an inescutcheon of the shield of the Duchy of Saxony, representing his paternal arms, the whole differenced by a label argent of three points, the outer points bearing anchors azure, and the inner a cross gules. When he became the Duke of Saxe-Coburg and Gotha, his Saxon arms were his British arms inverted, as follows: the ducal arms of Saxony charged with an inescutcheon of the royal arms of the United Kingdom differenced with a label argent of three points, the outer points bearing anchors azure, and the inner a cross gules.

| Prince Alfred's coat of arms as a British prince | Prince Alfred's heraldic shield as a British prince | Alfred's arms as Duke of Saxe-Coburg and Gotha | Heraldic shield as Duke of Saxe-Coburg and Gotha |

== Issue ==
| Image | Name | Birth | Death | Notes |
|---|---|---|---|---|
| | Prince Alfred | 15 October 1874 | 6 February 1899 | Hereditary Prince of Saxe-Coburg and Gotha from 22 August 1893 |
| | Princess Marie | 29 October 1875 | 18 July 1938 | married, 10 January 1893, King Ferdinand I of Romania (1865–1927); had issue |
| | Princess Victoria Melita | 25 November 1876 | 2 March 1936 | married (1), 19 April 1894, Ernst Ludwig, Grand Duke of Hesse and by Rhine; had issue; divorced 21 December 1901 (2) 8 October 1905, Grand Duke Kirill Vladimirovich of Russia; had issue |
| | Princess Alexandra | 1 September 1878 | 16 April 1942 | married, 20 April 1896, Ernst II, Prince of Hohenlohe-Langenburg; had issue |
| | Unnamed son | 13 October 1879 | 13 October 1879 | stillborn |
| | Princess Beatrice | 20 April 1884 | 13 July 1966 | married, 15 July 1909, Infante Alfonso, Duke of Galliera; had issue |

== Archives ==
Alfred's letters to his third daughter, Alexandra, (as well as her sisters) are preserved in the Hohenlohe Central Archive (Hohenlohe-Zentralarchiv Neuenstein) in Neuenstein Castle in the town of Neuenstein, Baden-Württemberg, Germany.

== Ancestry ==
Ancestors of Alfred, Duke of Saxe-Coburg and Gotha

8. Francis, Duke of Saxe-Coburg-Saalfeld (=14)
4. Ernest I of Saxe-Coburg and Gotha
9. Countess Augusta of Reuss-Ebersdorf (=15)
2. Prince Albert of Saxe-Coburg and Gotha
10. Augustus, Duke of Saxe-Gotha-Altenburg
5. Princess Louise of Saxe-Gotha-Altenburg
11. Duchess Louise Charlotte of Mecklenburg-Schwerin
1. Alfred, Duke of Saxe-Coburg and Gotha
12. George III of the United Kingdom
6. Prince Edward, Duke of Kent and Strathearn
13. Duchess Charlotte of Mecklenburg-Strelitz
3. Queen Victoria of the United Kingdom
14. Francis, Duke of Saxe-Coburg-Saalfeld (=8)
7. Princess Victoria of Saxe-Coburg-Saalfeld
15. Countess Augusta of Reuss-Ebersdorf (=9)

== Footnotes ==
Alfred, Duke of Saxe-Coburg and Gotha House of Saxe-Coburg and Gotha Cadet branch of the House of Wettin Born: 6 August 1844 Died: 30 July 1900
Regnal titles
| Preceded by Ernest II | Duke of Saxe-Coburg and Gotha; 1893–1900 | Succeeded by Charles Edward |
Military offices
| Preceded by Sir Henry Bentinck | Honorary Colonel of the 1st London Artillery Volunteer Corps; 1868–1875 | Office abolished |
| Preceded by Sir William Dowell | Senior Officer in Command of the Channel Squadron; 1883–1884 | Succeeded by Algernon de Horsey |
| Preceded by Lord John Hay | Commander-in-Chief, Mediterranean Fleet; 1886–1889 | Succeeded by Sir Anthony Hoskins |
| Preceded by Sir William Dowell | Commander-in-Chief, Plymouth; 1890–1893 | Succeeded by Sir Algernon Lyons |
