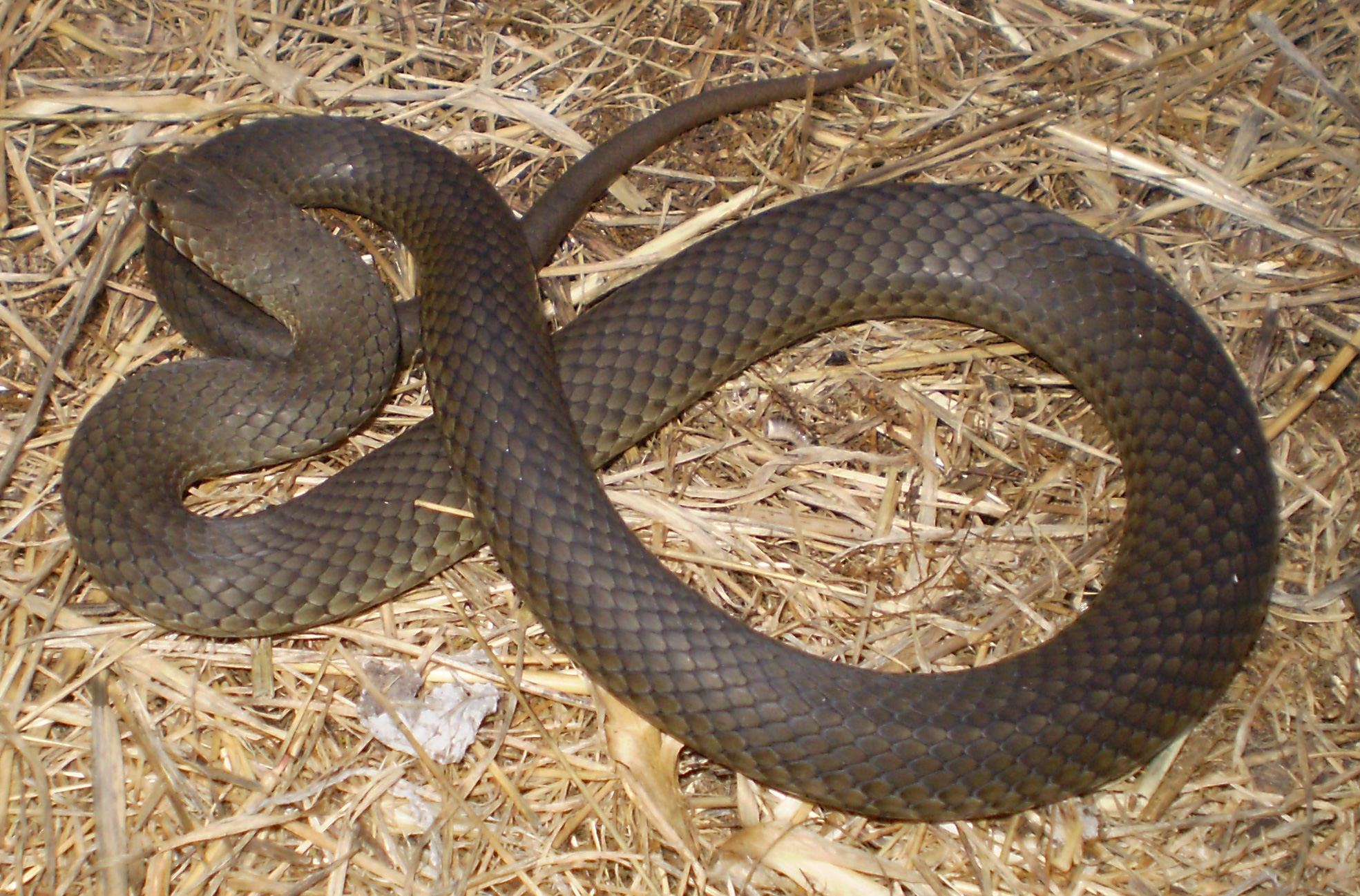

Conservation status
- Least Concern (IUCN 3.1)

Scientific classification
- Kingdom: Animalia
- Phylum: Chordata
- Class: Reptilia
- Order: Squamata
- Suborder: Serpentes
- Family: Elapidae
- Genus: Austrelaps
- Species: A. labialis

Binomial name
- Austrelaps labialis (Jan, 1859)
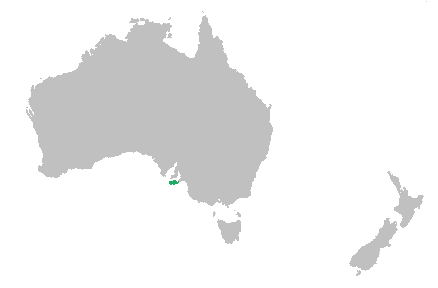
- Distribution (in green; click to enlarge)

Synonyms
- Alecto labialis Jan, 1859

= Pygmy copperhead =

Venomous snake of South Australia

The pygmy copperhead (Austrelaps labialis) is an Australian venomous elapid snake species found on Kangaroo Island Fleurieu Peninsula and the Mount Lofty Ranges where it is considered under threat. It is the only snake endemic to South Australia. It is from the Austrelaps genus along with two other species of copperhead, the Highland and Lowland copperhead snakes.

Adult pygmy copperhead snakes grow to an average of 80 cm (31 in) making it the smallest of Australian copperheads. It preys on small reptiles and frogs. Their bite is considered possibly lethal but they are unlikely to attack unless stepped on or purposely provoked.

They are not considered to be in need of conservation.

== Taxonomy ==
The pygmy copperhead was first described as the Alecto Labialis by Giorgio Jan in 1859. This name was also briefly given to the White-lipped Snake in 1873 by Jan and associate Ferdinando Sordelli.

It was formerly included in Austrelaps superbus which, at the time, also included the highland and lowland copperhead snakes under the same name. The three species were officially separated in 1991 in a publication from P. A. Rawlinson, detailing key differences in appearance, distribution and behaviour between each type. This publication renames the pygmy copperhead to Austrelaps labialis, with Austrelaps superbus remaining the name for the highland copperhead.

Snake-catcher Raymond Hoser has disputed the separation of species in Austrelaps, claiming the main separation is related only to environmentally influenced changes. His paper has however been challenged by the wider community.

The common naming of the snake refers to the colouration of the scales on top of its body and those surrounding the snake's snout and eyes, and "pygmy" refers to the species being smaller than the highland and lowland counterparts. Other common names include the pigmy copperhead, dwarf copperhead, Adelaide Hills copperhead and Jan's copperhead.

It is not closely related to the American copperhead, Agkistrodon contortrix (Viperidae).

== Description ==
The pygmy copperhead is the smallest of Australian copperhead snakes. It is expected for the males to grow to a larger size than the females, but the pygmy copperhead's ratio is more marked than most other snake species. On average, the adult male snake reaches 80 cm (31.5 in) in length, with larger specimens reaching 120 cm (47.2 in) long. The total length the snake can reach has been debated, with previous publications and research only finding specimens of 60 cm, 70 cm and 85 cm.

On both sexes, the dorsal scales come in shades of brown to grey, with a notable darker stripe along the spine. The abdominal area is cream to light-grey in colouration, with varying intensities of red along the edges before transitioning to the brown-grey backside. The labial scales of the pygmy copperhead are barred with dark colouration. There can be from 140 to 165 ventral scales and 35–55 subcaudal scales, with an average of 15 rows of scales along their mid-bodies, and a single anal scale.

Newborns often have paler backsides in comparison to adult pygmy copperheads.

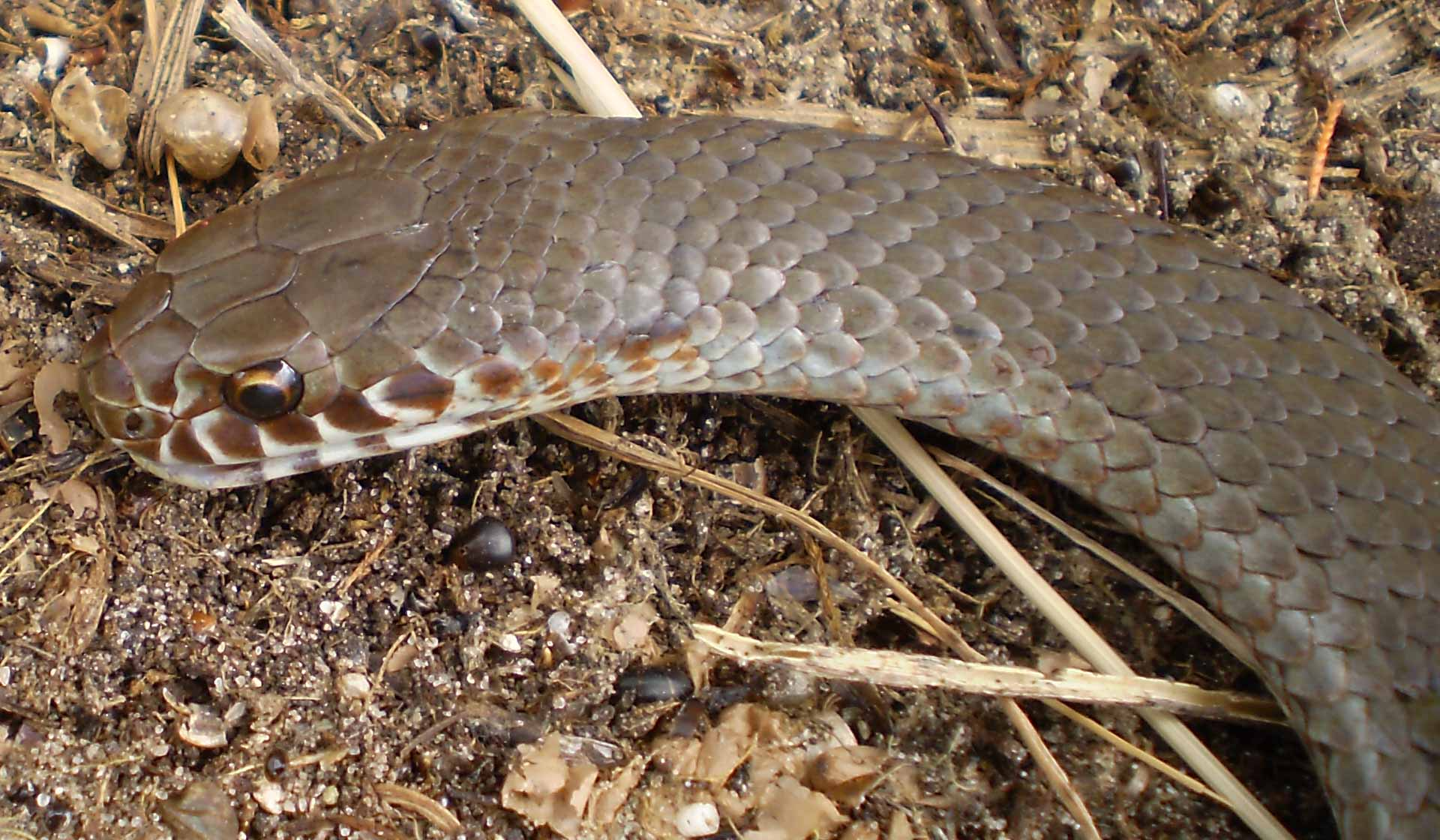
Austrelaps labialis head

== Distribution and habitat ==
The pygmy copperhead is endemic to Australia and restricted to a small section of South Australia (state), particularly Kangaroo Island and immediately adjacent mainland within the Fleurieu Peninsula and the Mount Lofty Ranges.

The limited area is characteristically moist, with an average yearly rainfall of 600–800 mm (23.6–31.5 in) and milder summer temperatures, 23–25 °C (73.4–77.0 °F). They are found living in concentrated numbers near streams, in swamps, marshland and open sclerophyll woodlands and forests. The cold temperatures in these areas are notably too low for many other reptilian species.

There have been sightings of individual pygmy copperheads in the Adelaide Hills, as well as on islands between the Australian mainland and Tasmania, including Flinders Island, Hunter Island, Kangaroo Island, King Island, Preservation Island and Great Dog Island, probably from having accidentally stowed away on boats.

== Behaviour and relationship with humans ==
The pygmy copperhead is a common species but rarely seen. It is generally unobtrusive, commonly hiding under leaf litter, old iron and haystacks. The lowland and highland species can be potentially dangerous, but being smaller, the pygmy is not known for being aggressive. They are all considered non-threatening unless provoked. Combat between males signifies sexual maturity in snakes, but it has not been observed in pygmy copperheads, despite the lowland and highland species exhibiting at two years of age.

== Feeding ==
Being carnivorous, the pygmy copperhead's diet consists of smaller ectotherms, most commonly including small lizards, frogs and tadpoles. They are known to feed more frequently than highland and lowland copperheads. There have also been reports of cannibalism in the pygmy copperheads.

== Venom ==
Bites are considered lethal without prompt anti-venom intervention, with possible irreversible presynaptic damage. The pygmy copperhead's venom is classed as strongly neurotoxic, with toxicity similar to that of the Indian cobra. It is weakly coagulant and strongly anticoagulant, with the ability to be both blood and muscle destroying. Antivenom developed through the tiger snake is unable to completely neutralise the neurotoxicity of the whole venom, nor a modified version in research lab trials.

== Reproduction ==
The pygmy copperhead is viviparous, commonly giving live birth to seven young in each litter, with an average maximum of 20 young in a single litter. The litter size is half that of the other Australian copperheads, attributed to their smaller body size and the maternal snout-vent length (SVL) and litter size ratio. There also appears to be a skewed sex ratio towards males. Female ovulation in the pygmy copperhead is in spring, but field research found that only two thirds of surveyed (apparently adult) females were reproductive, suggesting that females do not reproduce every year.
