= Jellyfish stings in Australia =

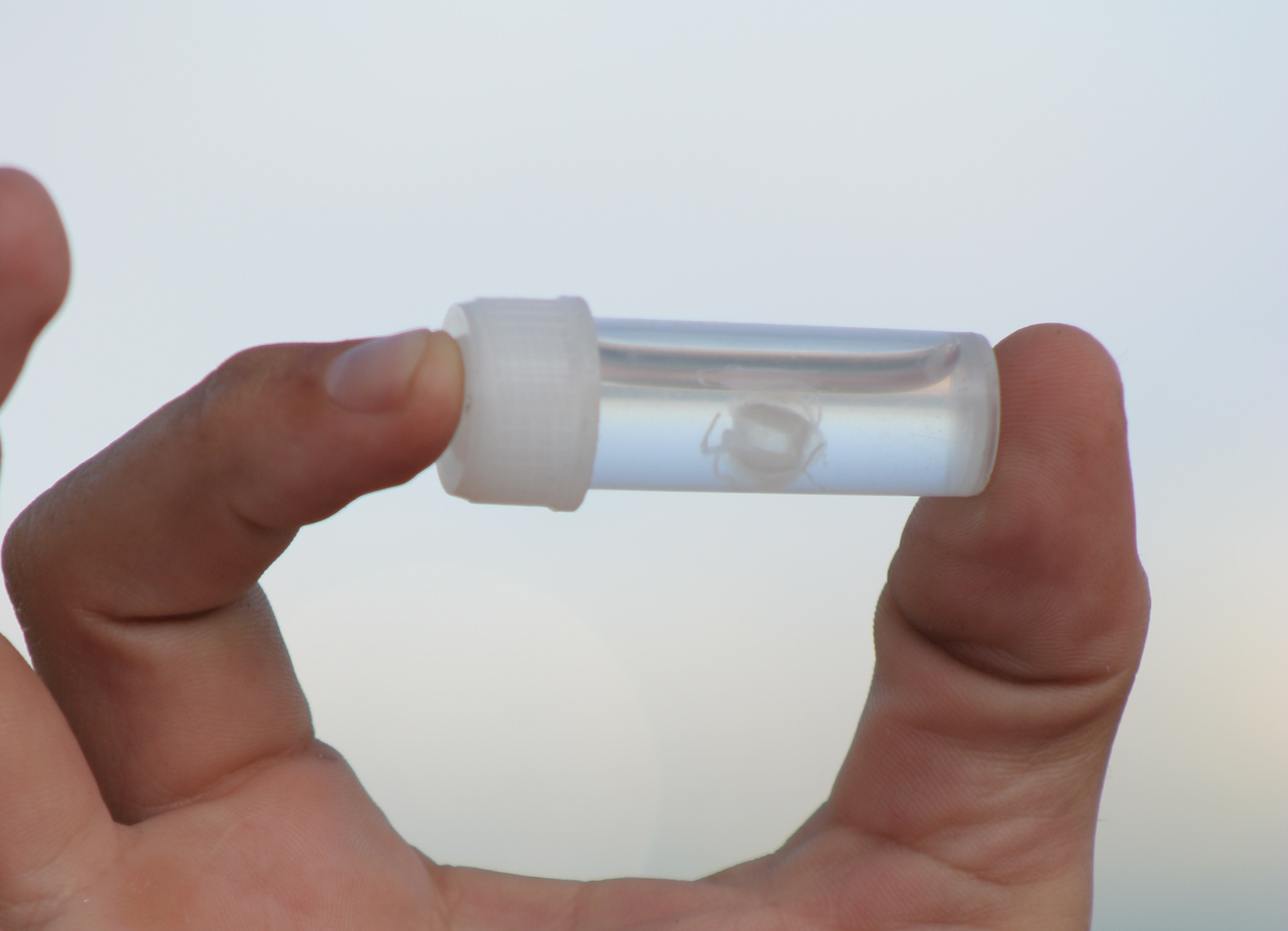
The Irukandji Jellyfish is tiny, but very venomous.

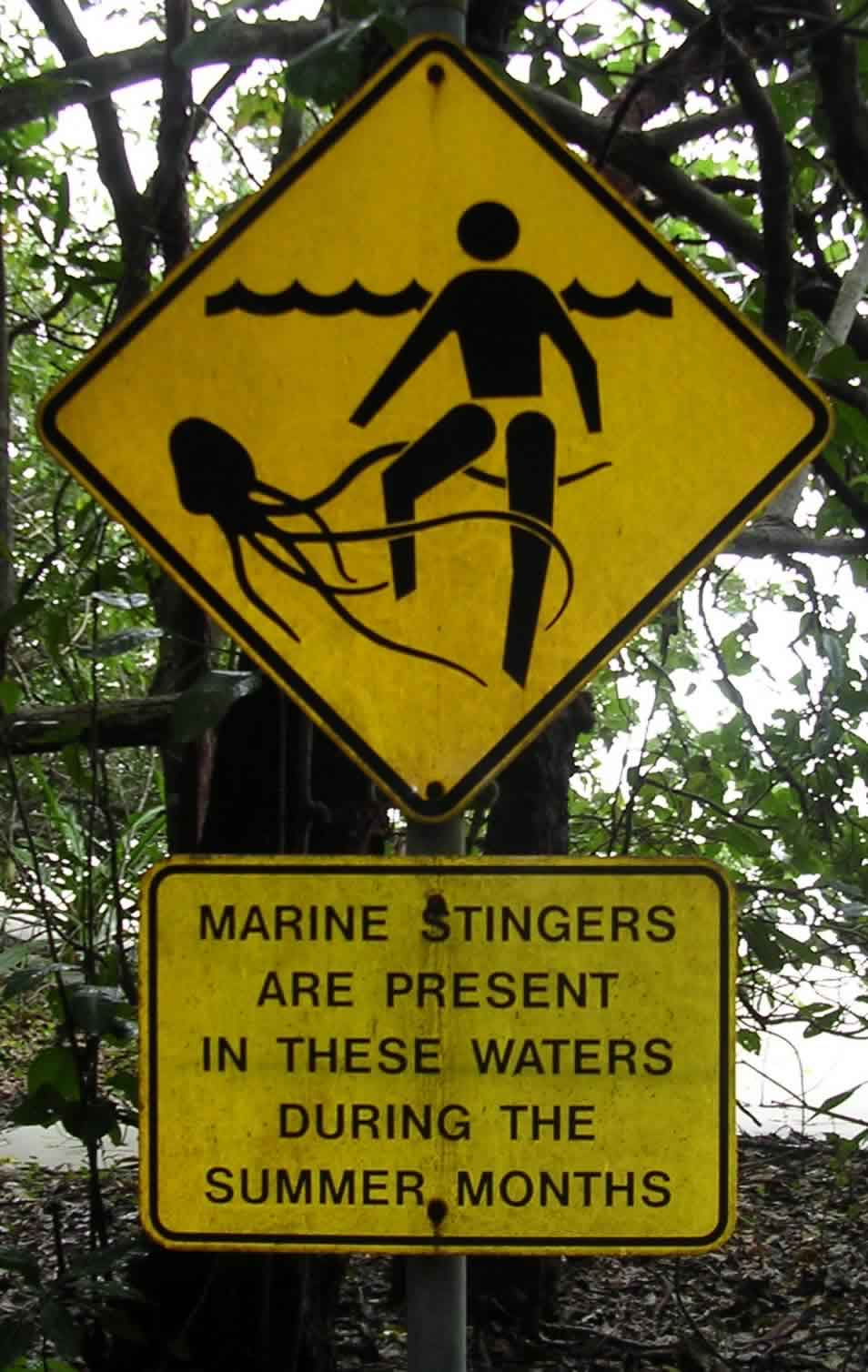
A signpost warns swimmers of the presence of Chironex fleckeri (box jellyfish)

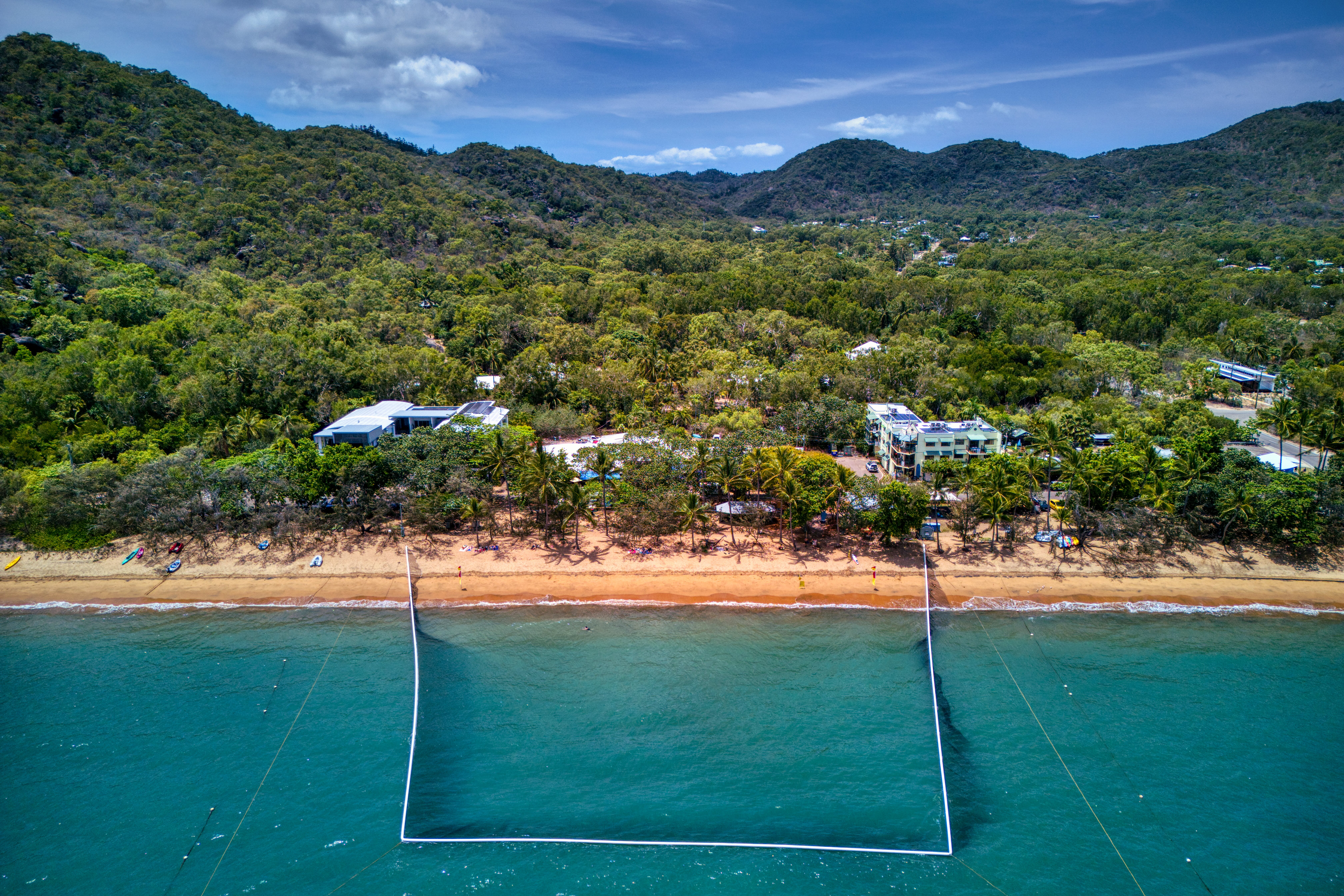
Stinger Net

Jellyfish stings in Australia are medically significant, as they can cause intense pain, paralysis and sometimes the death of swimmers with exposed skin. Highly venomous species are found in the tropical north of the country, including the Australian box jellyfish (Chironex fleckeri) and the Irukandji jellyfish (Carukia barnesi and other types). They are believed to have caused at least 69 deaths since record keeping began in the late 1800s. Although they are commonly mistaken for jellyfish, bluebottles are actually siphonophores.

== Numbers of stings ==
Irukandji are rarely found outside Queensland, the Northern Territory and Western Australia. Between 1985 and 1997 from cases of Irukandji sting where location was recorded, there were 83.4% in Queensland, 9.1% in the Northern Territory, and 7.5% in Western Australia; 81.5% of cases occurred in the afternoon. In a fourteen-year period there were 660 Irukandji stings in Australia, which were recorded by Dr Fenner, a medical officer with Surf Lifesaving Australia. There were 159 Irukandji stings reported in Broome in a five-year period with 25% of those stung being hospitalised but no recorded deaths. There were 62 people reported being stung by Irukandji in Cairns in 1996; of these more than half occurred in December, 92% were stung on hotter than average days, with 63% occurring while swimming inside a stinger net enclosure on the beach. In summer 2001–02 there were 160 people stung by the middle of February, with around 100 of these in Cairns, and between 10 and 20 in Townsville, the Whitsundays, Great Keppel and Agnes Water.

Northern Territory hospitals report approximately 40 jellyfish stings annually.

== List of fatal stings ==
This is a list of known fatal jellyfish stings that have occurred in Australian territorial waters in reverse chronological order. Newspaper references to the Portuguese man o' war in many of the early incidents are now known to be erroneous. Instead, the Chironex fleckeri is assumed to be the agent responsible in nearly all such events.

=== 21st century ===
| Name | Age | Year | Month | State or Territory | Location; Comments |
|---|---|---|---|---|---|
| Unnamed male | 14 | 2022 | February | Queensland | Eimeo Beach, Mackay. |
| Unnamed male | 17 | 2021 | February | Queensland | Cape York. Patterson Point, near Bamaga. |
| Unnamed victims | 74 and 76 | 2016 | November | Queensland | Michelmas Cay. Two French tourists died within 10 minutes of each other. Cardiologist hypothesised that they were stung by Irukandji. This was dismissed as speculation by the tour operator. |
| Unnamed male | 6 | 2007 | November | Northern Territory | |
| Unnamed female | 7 | 2006 | January | Queensland | Umagico Beach near Bamaga. |
| Unnamed male | 7 | 2003 | March | Queensland | Wongaling Beach near Cairns, stung on chest and neck. Allegedly the 68th person in Australia known to have died from a chironex fleckeri sting since records began in 1883. |
| Robert King | 44 | 2002 | April | Queensland | Port Douglas. Irukandji |
| Unnamed male | 58 | 2002 | January | Queensland | Hamilton Island, Whitsunday Islands. Irukandji |
| Unnamed male | 5 | 2000 | January | Queensland | Yarrabah, near Cairns |

=== 20th century ===
| Name | Age | Year | Month | State or Territory | Location; Comments |
|---|---|---|---|---|---|
| Unnamed male | 13 | 1988 | April | Northern Territory | Snake Bay, Melville Island. |
| Unnamed male | 9 | 1988 | February | Northern Territory | Garden Point, Melville Island. |
| Unnamed male | 5 | 1987 | January | Queensland | |
| Unnamed female | 6 | 1985 | December | Northern Territory | Milingimbi, Arnhem Land. |
| Unnamed female | 8 | 1984 | November | Northern Territory | Elcho Island, Arnhem Land. |
| Unnamed male | 6 | 1984 | January | Queensland | Lockhart River, 300 km (190 mi) north of Cooktown. |
| Unnamed male | 8 | 1983 | December | Northern Territory | Milingimbi, Arnhem Land. |
| Unnamed female | 8 | 1983 | April | Northern Territory | Goulburn Island. |
| Unnamed male | 5 | 1980 | December | Queensland | Wongaling, near Tully. Animals were observed by victim's older brother. |
| Unnamed male | 6 | 1980 | September | Northern Territory | Snake Bay, Melville Island. |
| Unnamed male | 6 | 1979 | December | Northern Territory | Maningrida, Arnhem Land. |
| Unnamed male | 6 | 1978 | January | Northern Territory | Maningrida, Arnhem Land. |
| Unnamed female | 6 | 1977 | January | Northern Territory | Snake Bay, Melville Island. |
| Unnamed female | 4 | 1975 | December | Northern Territory | Yirrkala, Arnhem Land. |
| Unnamed female | 4 | 1975 | February | Northern Territory | Bathurst Island. |
| Unnamed male | 2 | 1974 | April | Northern Territory | Melville Island. |
| Unnamed female | 26 | 1971 | November | Queensland | North Mission Beach. Investigated by Dr J. S. Barnes of Cairns. |
| Gregory Noel Jarrot | 12 | 1971 | January | Queensland | Seaforth Beach, 40 km (25 mi) north of Mackay. |
| K.C. | 20 | 1970 | December | Queensland | Forrest Beach. |
| Unnamed female | 8 | 1970 | March | Northern Territory | Shoal Bay, Darwin. |
| Unnamed female | 7 | 1967 | January | Northern Territory | Milingimbi, Arnhem Land. |
| James Woolla | 10 | 1967 | January | Queensland | Aurukun. |
| Unnamed male | 4 | 1966 | January | Queensland | Half Moon Bay. |
| Terence Barney | 5 | 1965 | January | Queensland | Mornington Island, Gulf of Carpentaria. Aboriginal boy was pronounced DOA at hospital. |
| Paul Haritos | 6 | 1964 | February | Northern Territory | Mica Beach, four miles from Darwin. Victim was standing in calf-deep water. Collapsed instantly and died quickly. |
| Unnamed female | 9 | 1964 | January | Queensland | Palm Cove. Occurred "a few months earlier" than the Paul Haritos incident. |
| G.C.D | 6 | 1962 | December | Queensland | South Mission Beach. |
| R.V.B | 50 | 1962 | January | Queensland | Yorkey's Knob. |
| Unnamed victim | 7 | 1962 | January | Queensland | Thursday Island. |
| J.R.K | 9 | 1962 | January | Queensland | Bamaga. |
| P.Y | 4 | 1961 | December | Northern Territory | Maningrida, Liverpool River. |
| D.N | 3 | 1959 | May | Northern Territory | Maningrida, Liverpool River. |
| Lynette Mary Starkey | 11 | 1957 | December | Queensland | North Mission Beach, Queensland. Stung on the legs while bathing with other children in shallow water. Collapsed on the beach and died. Weals visible on her legs. |
| Robert Tennant | 10 | 1957 | March | Queensland | Bluff Beach. |
| T.W.S | 38 | 1956 | December | Queensland | Pearce Creek. |
| D. | Young | 1955 | December | Northern Territory | Myilly Point, Bathurst Island. |
| Unnamed male | | 1955 | | Queensland | Cardwell |
| B. | 6 | 1955 | | Northern Territory | Rose River. |
| S.W. | 4 | 1954 | December | Northern Territory | Snake Bay, Melville Island. |
| Clarke William Currow | 8 | 1954 | February | Northern Territory | Darwin, close to Larrakeyah army barracks, three yards from shore. Died a few minutes after being stung. |
| James Ernest Lane | 33 | 1953 | July | Queensland | Saltwater Creek, Townsville. Victim experienced severe pain, paralysis and frothing at the mouth. |
| Unnamed victim | | 1951 | | Queensland | Kissing Point Baths, Townsville |
| Wojcik Czestaw | 31 | 1950 | | Northern Territory | Mindil Beach, Darwin. Died within minutes of being stung. Specimen was collected and identified by Frank McNeill, curator of invertebrates at the Australian Museum. Victim's name was also reported as Wokeik (rather than Wojcik). |
| Brian Andrew McNamara | 10 | 1949 | December | Queensland | North Mission Beach near Tully. |
| D. | Young | 1947 | December | Queensland | Appel Channel, Mornington Island. |
| Unnamed male | Ca. 20 | 1944 | January | Northern Territory | Victim was a serviceman. |
| W.J.H | 21 | 1943 | March | Queensland | South Mission Beach. |
| Robert Ernest Day | 8 | 1941 | December | Queensland | Rowe's Bay, Townsville. Boy died en route to hospital. |
| Unnamed male | Ca. 20 | 1941 | April | Northern Territory | Darwin. |
| J.C. | 13 | 1941 | January | Queensland | Townsville. |
| Patrick Paull | 3 1/2 | 1939 | December | Queensland | Horseshoe Bay. |
| Ruth Hamilton | 5 | 1939 | February | Queensland | Googarra Beach. |
| Thomas "Tommy" Frederick Chandler | 11 | 1938 | March | Northern Territory | Lameroo Beach, Darwin. Government baths. Stung on chest, body and face. Jellyfish specimen was collected for analysis. Victim's name was also reported as Robert Chandler. Chandler died 15–20 minutes after being stung. A boy called Bennie Babun who went to his rescue was also stung and hospitalised. Others stung during prior fortnight were treated with morphine. |
| David William Taylor | 19 | 1937 | | Queensland | Bramston Beach near Babinda, Cairns. Stung while in waist-deep water. Assisted from the water by George Giffin but collapsed and died thereafter. |
| Salvatore Cantarella | | 1934 | | Queensland | Googarra Beach, near Tully. Marks on right leg and left foot. Believed to have died of shock and heart failure after the sting. Post-mortem conducted by Dr. A. R. Townsend. |
| Maurice Woods | 7 | 1930 | January | Queensland | Magnetic Island, near Townsville. |
| "Mr. Mann" | | 1923 | February | Queensland | Proserpine |
| Charles Trenaman | 15 | 1916 | March | Queensland | Rowes Bay, near Townsville Stung on neck, body, shoulder and legs. Died about 10 minutes later from "nerve shock from pain". |
| Albert George | 11 | 1911 | May | Queensland | Cannon Valley beach, Pioneer Bay, near Mackay. Arms attached to the boy's belly, torso and arms. Victim lost consciousness and died within half an hour. Open bathing at this location was prohibited after this second death within 6 months. |
| F.L. Gould | 12 | 1910 | December | Queensland | Occurred during Christmas holiday period. Cannon Valley beach, Pioneer Bay, near Mackay. |

=== 19th century ===
| Name | Age | Year | Month | State or Territory | Location; Comments |
|---|---|---|---|---|---|
| Fred Harwood | 14 | 1892 | November | Northern Territory | Sea baths, Darwin |
| C.E.K | 6 | 1885 | January | Queensland | Strand, Townsville |
| Frederick William Smith | 11 | 1884 | December | Queensland | Ross Creek, Townsville |
| Peter Clarke | 8 | 1878 | December | Queensland | Cleveland Bay, Townsville. Victim had livid marks on legs. Fell unconscious about a minute after being carried out of the water and was dead within ten minutes. |

== See also ==
- Irukandji syndrome
