= Prince Alfred Bay =

Bay in Nunavut, Canada

- Location within Nunavut
- Location: Wellington Channel
- Coordinates: 76°19′N 93°22′W
- Ocean/sea sources: Arctic Ocean
- Basin countries: Canada
- Settlements: Uninhabited

Prince Alfred Bay is a waterway in the Qikiqtaaluk Region, Nunavut, Canada. It lies off the western coast of Devon Island, forming a border of the Grinnell Peninsula, in the eastern high Arctic. Like Pioneer Bay to the south, it is an arm of Wellington Channel.

== Geography ==
Prince Alfred Bay's southern coast is characterized by rugged hills.
