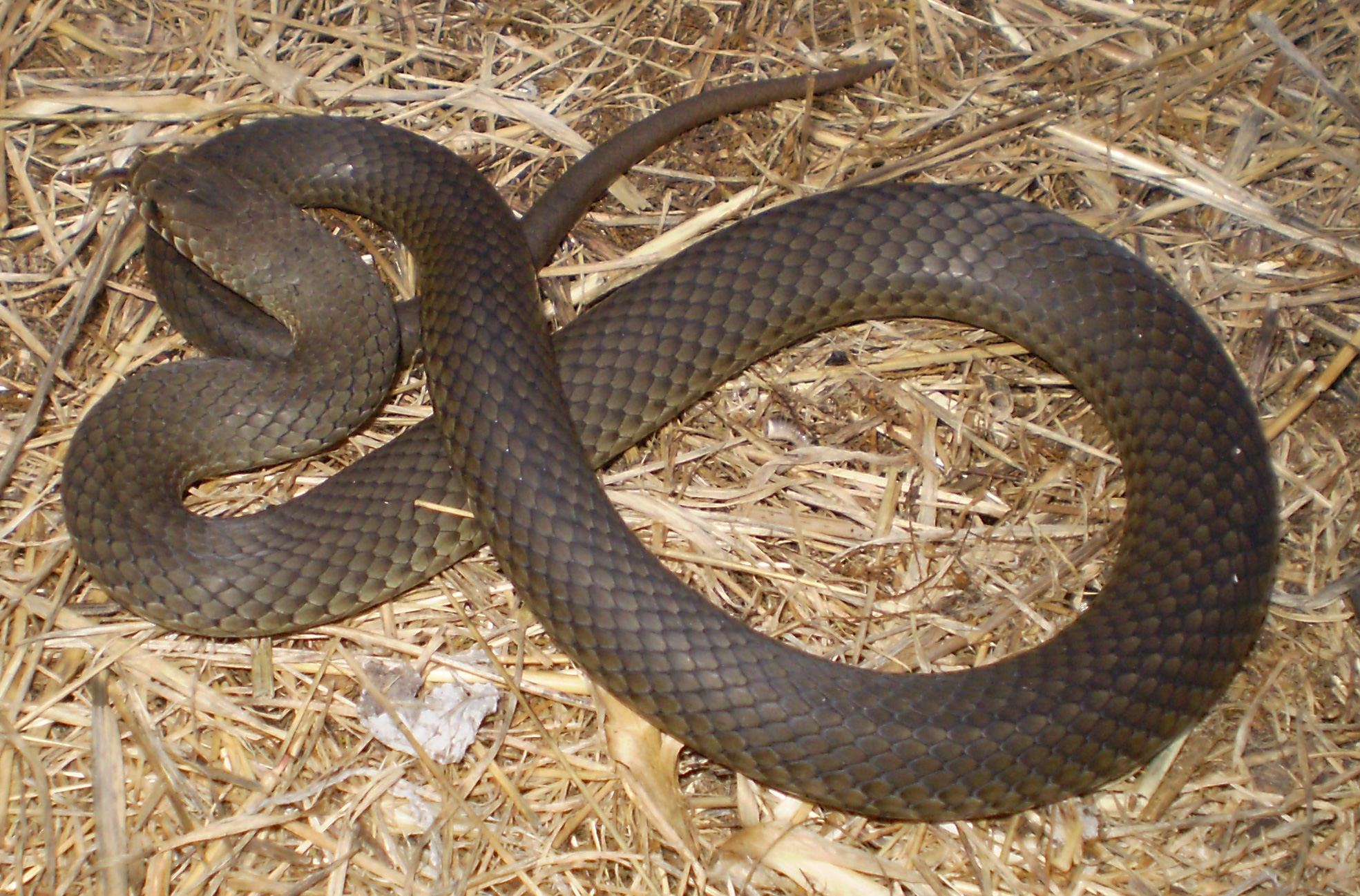
- Austrelaps labialis

Scientific classification
- Kingdom: Animalia
- Phylum: Chordata
- Class: Reptilia
- Order: Squamata
- Suborder: Serpentes
- Family: Elapidae
- Subfamily: Hydrophiinae
- Genus: Austrelaps; Worrell, 1963

Type species
- Austrelaps superbus

= Austrelaps =

Genus of snakes

Austrelaps is a genus of venomous elapid snakes native to the relatively fertile, temperate, southern and eastern part of the Australian continent. Three species are currently recognized, with no subspecies. They are commonly called copperheads or Australian copperheads. They are not closely related to the American copperhead, Agkistrodon contortrix.

== Description ==
There are three species of Australian copperheads: the pygmy copperhead, the highland copperhead, and the lowland copperhead. The pygmy copperhead is 60 cm (2.0 ft) long, and lives in South Australia and on Kangaroo Island. The highland copperhead is 1.25 m (4.1 ft) in length and lives in alpine areas of Victoria and New South Wales. The lowland copperhead reaches 1.75 m (5 ft 9 in) in length and lives in southern Victoria into Tasmania. Their colour varies a great deal, from a coppery mid-brown to yellowish, reddish, grey or even black, depending on the individual. The copper head colouring that gave rise to the common name is not always present. Some individuals also have visible markings just behind the head. Perhaps in consequence of their great variation, it was not realised until the second half of the 20th century that there were three different species. Venom toxicity has been measured at 0.5 mg/kg subcutaneous, at least for the lowland copperhead.

== Common names ==
Common names include copperhead, diamond snake, superb snake, lowland snake, and highland snake.

== Distribution and habitat ==
Copperheads are well adapted to cooler climates; they remain active after most reptiles have become dormant, and are the first to resume hunting at the end of winter. Their favoured habitat is near water. While they are moderately uncommon elsewhere, they congregate in substantial numbers where conditions are suitable.

== Behaviour ==
Copperheads are diurnal at most times of year, but switch to night hunting in hot weather.

=== Diet ===
Copperheads are very much at home in the water; they swim well and often hunt tadpoles. They are generalised carnivores and will take any suitably-sized prey, including their own young, but the major diet item is frogs. Where frogs are common, so too are copperheads, and other snakes tend to be rare.

=== Breeding ===
Breeding starts in spring, and females give birth in late summer to about 14 live young, each a little under 20 cm (7.9 in) long.

=== Venom ===
Like all elapids (members of the family Elapidae), Australian copperheads have hollow, fixed fangs mounted at the front of the jaw. They are shy and retiring by nature, and prefer to escape rather than fight where escape is possible. Their venom is, by Australian standards, only moderately toxic (equal on a per-mg basis to that of the Indian cobra). Nevertheless, they deliver a substantial quantity of venom, and a copperhead bite left untreated can easily kill a healthy adult human. There is no specific copperhead antivenom, but tiger snake antivenom is effective.

== Species ==
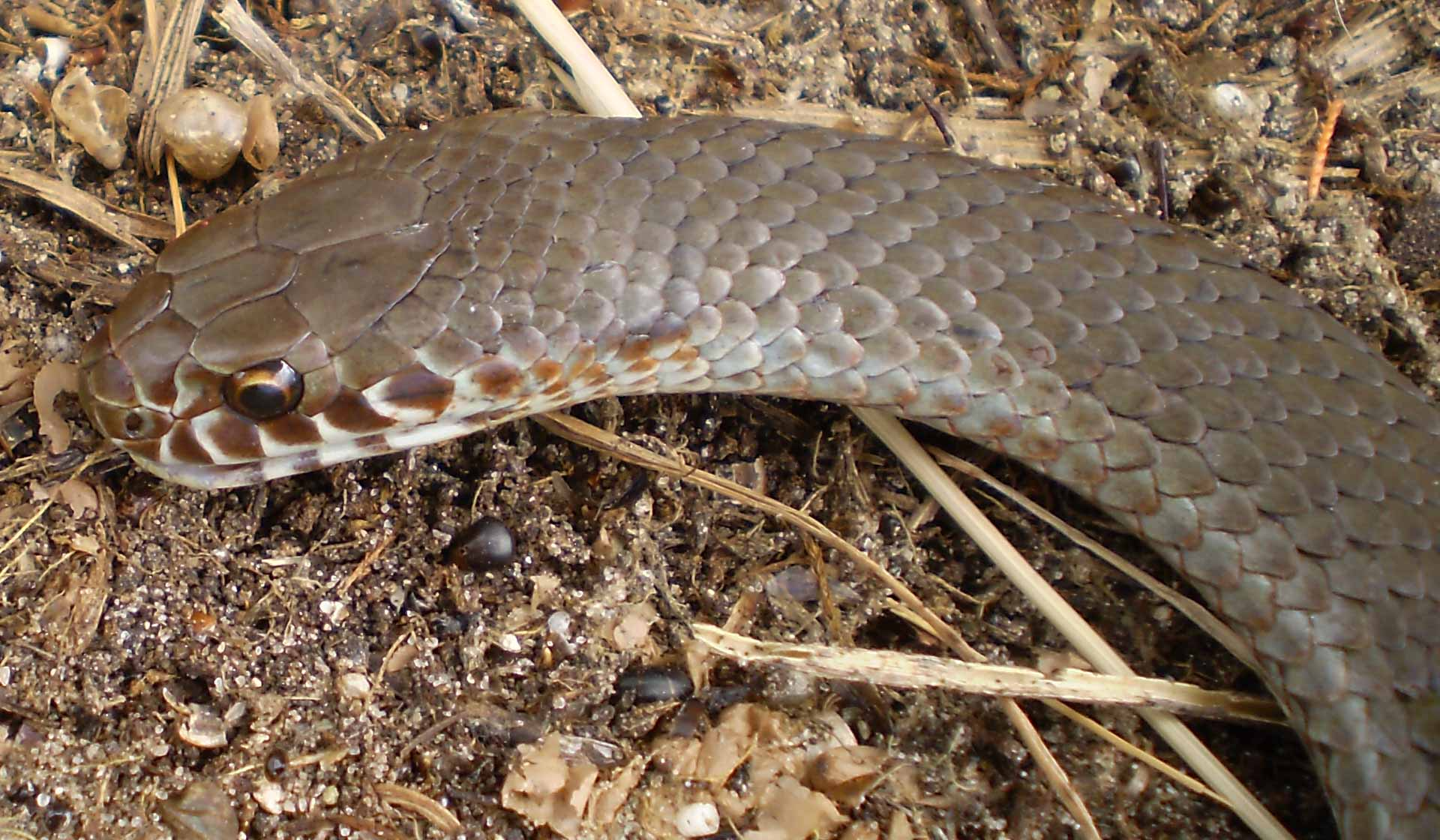
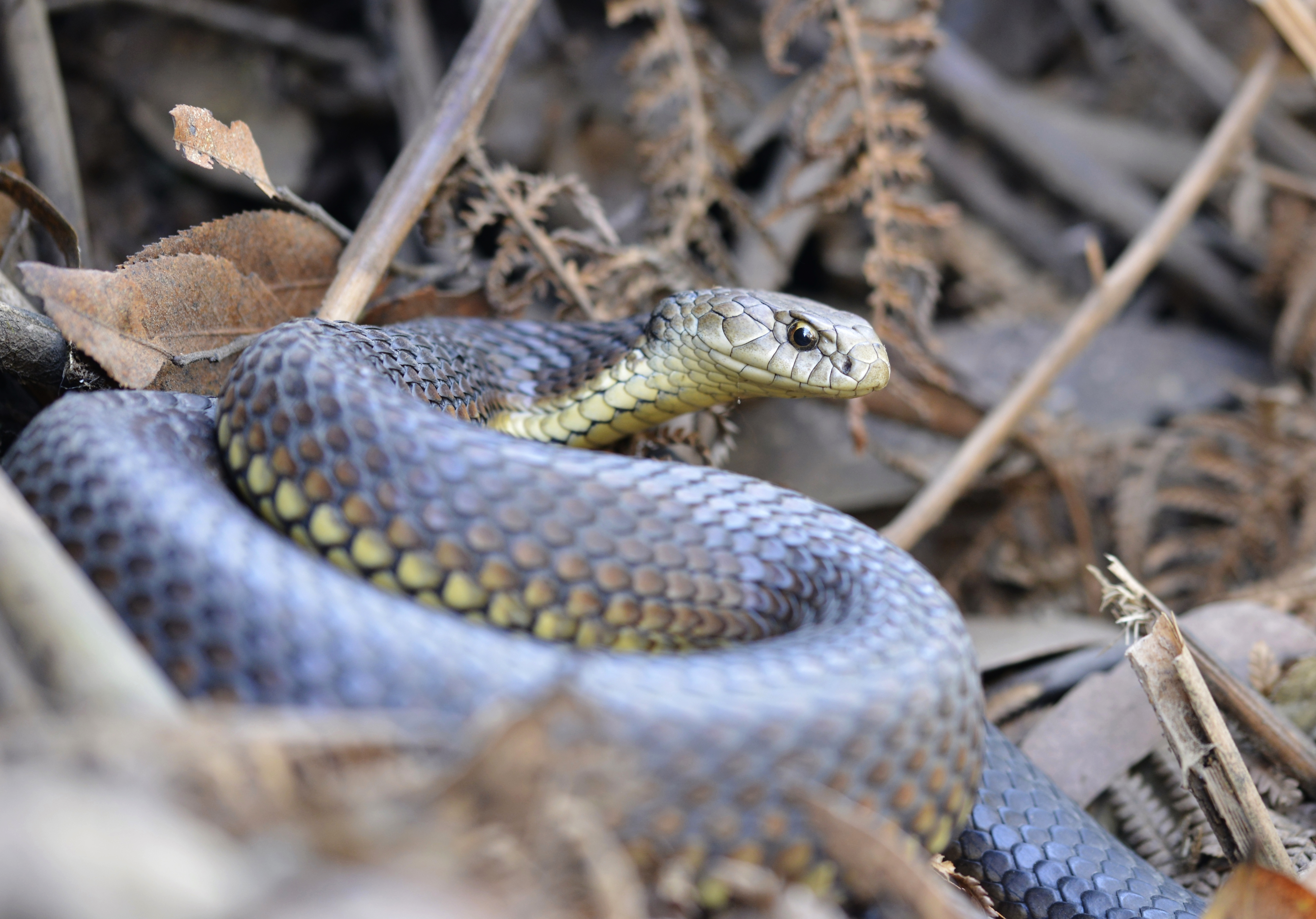
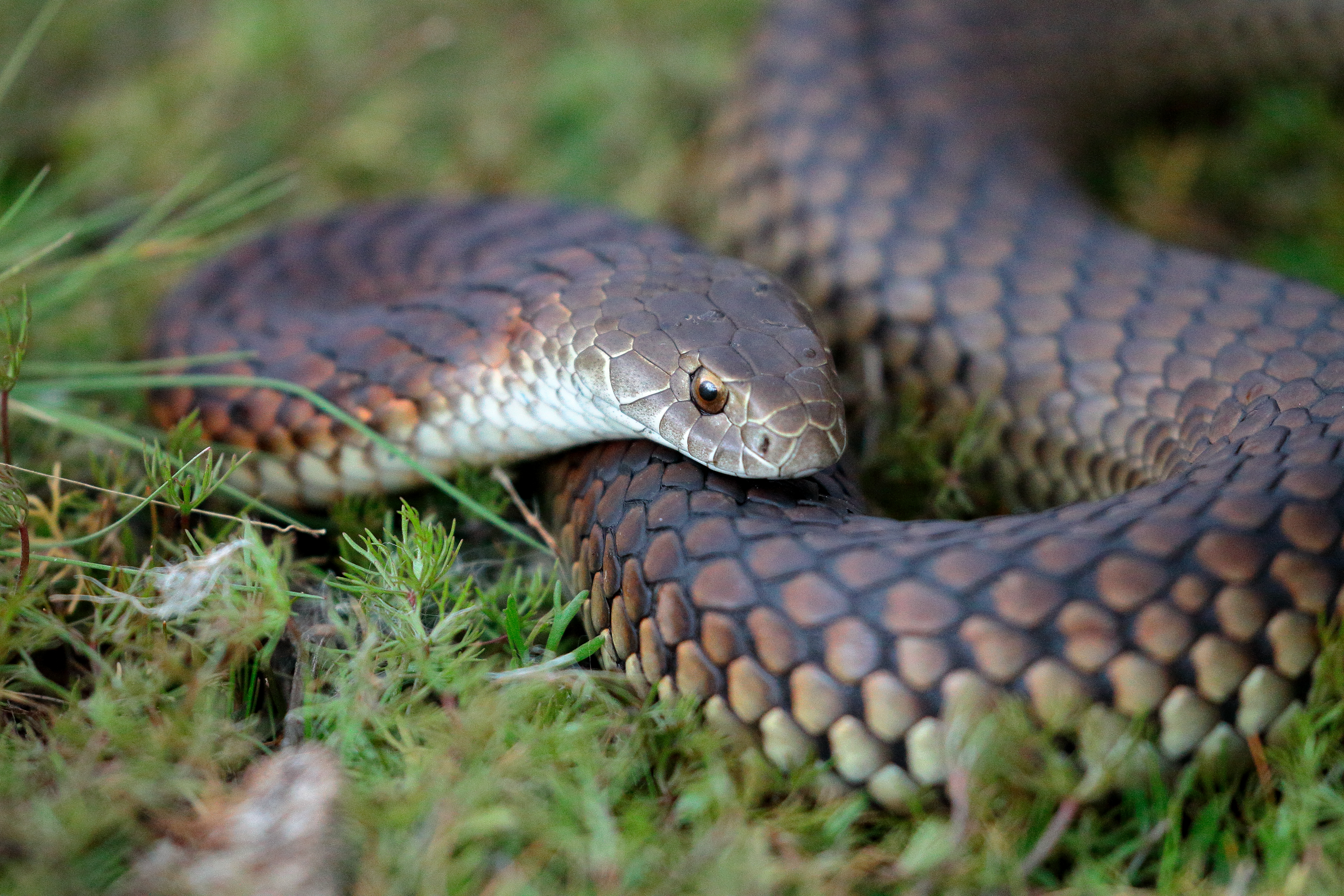
Image	Species	Authority	Common name	Geographic range
	A. labialis	(Jan, 1859)	pygmy copperhead	Australia (South Australia)
	A. ramsayi	(Krefft, 1864)	highland copperhead	Australia (New South Wales, Victoria)
	A. superbus	(Günther, 1858)	lowland copperhead	Australia (New South Wales, South Australia, Tasmania, Victoria)
