= Pioneer Bay =

Bay in Qikiqtaaluk Region, Nunavut, Canada

- Location within Nunavut
- Location: Wellington Channel
- Coordinates: 76°06′N 92°45′W
- Ocean/sea sources: Arctic Ocean
- Basin countries: Canada
- Settlements: Uninhabited

Pioneer Bay is a waterway in the Qikiqtaaluk Region, Nunavut, Canada. It lies off the southwestern coast of Devon Island in the eastern high Arctic. Like Baring Bay to the south and Prince Alfred Bay to the north, it is an arm of Wellington Channel.

== History ==
In 1908, Frederick Cook, an American explorer and physician, explored in this region.
