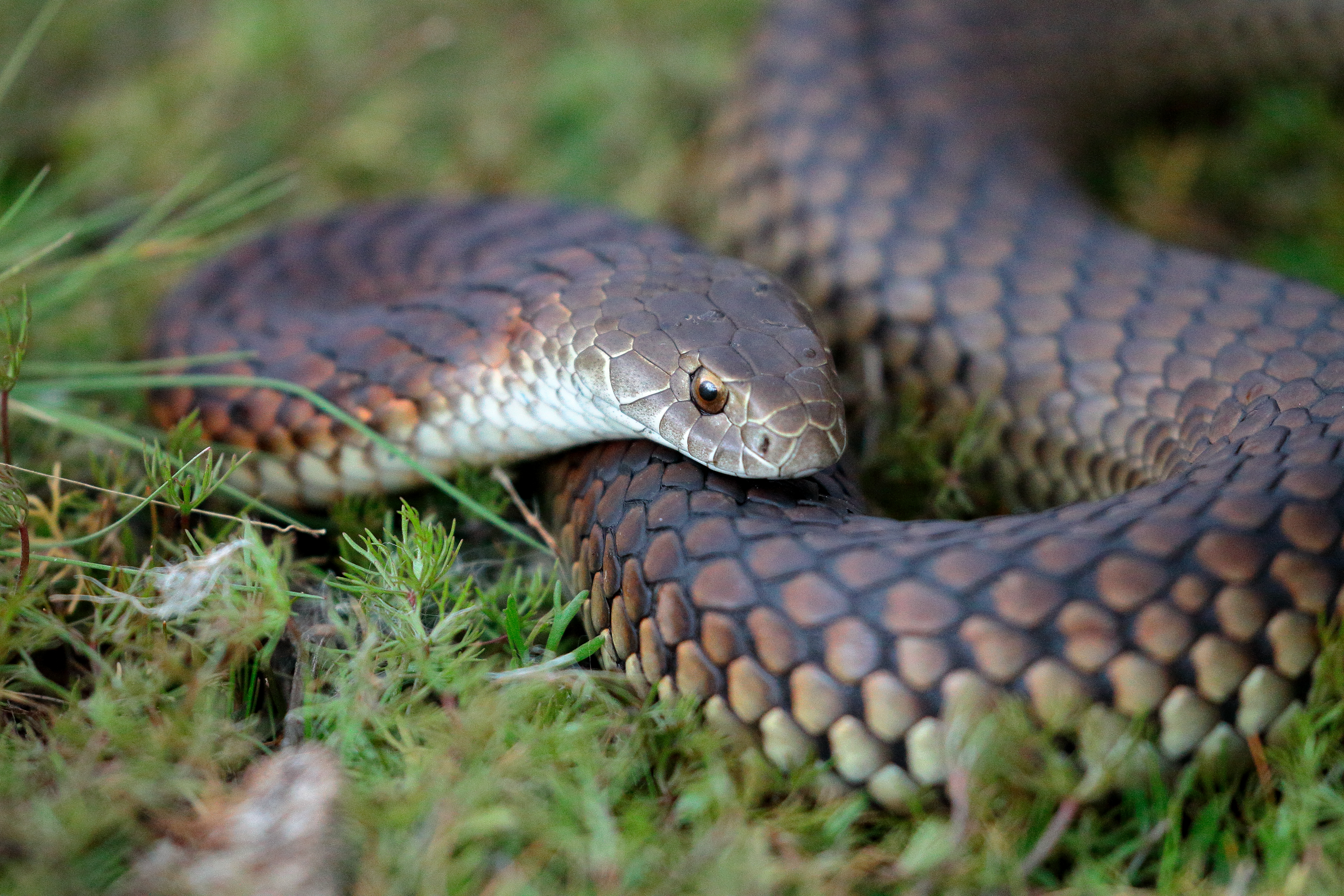
- lowland copperhead, Mullawallah Wetland

Conservation status
- Least Concern (IUCN 3.1)

Scientific classification
- Domain: Eukaryota
- Kingdom: Animalia
- Phylum: Chordata
- Class: Reptilia
- Order: Squamata
- Suborder: Serpentes
- Family: Elapidae
- Genus: Austrelaps
- Species: A. superbus

Binomial name
- Austrelaps superbus (Günther, 1858)

Synonyms
- Hoplocephalus superbus Günther, 1858; Denisonia superba – Boulenger, 1896

= Lowland copperhead =

Highly venomous snake native to southeastern Australia including Tasmania

The lowland copperhead or lowlands copperhead (Austrelaps superbus) is a venomous snake species in the family Elapidae, found in southeastern Australia, including Tasmania. It is commonly referred to as the copperhead, but is not closely related to the American copperhead, Agkistrodon contortrix. If provoked, the lowland copperhead is a dangerous snake with neurotoxic venom, which can kill an adult human if correct first aid is not applied promptly.

== Description ==
The lowland copperhead is generally 1-1.5 m (3–5 feet) long. Their colour varies a great deal, from a coppery mid-brown to yellowish, reddish, grey or black. The copper head colouring that gave rise to the common name is not always present. Its venom has been measured at 0.5 mg/kg subcutaneous.

== Distribution and habitat ==
It is found in southeastern Australia, including Tasmania. A. superbus has a preference for areas of low vegetation near water bodies where it hunts for frogs, lizards and snakes, including smaller specimens of its own species. It has been found in sandstone ridgetop woodland in the Blue Mountains, west of Sydney, where it is becoming rare, due to increasing fires and the spread of urban settlements.

== Venom ==
The venom of lowland copperhead contains postsynaptic neurotoxins. There have been a dozen reported bites from this species, with one fatality.
