= Mount St John, Queensland =

Mount St John
- Suburb
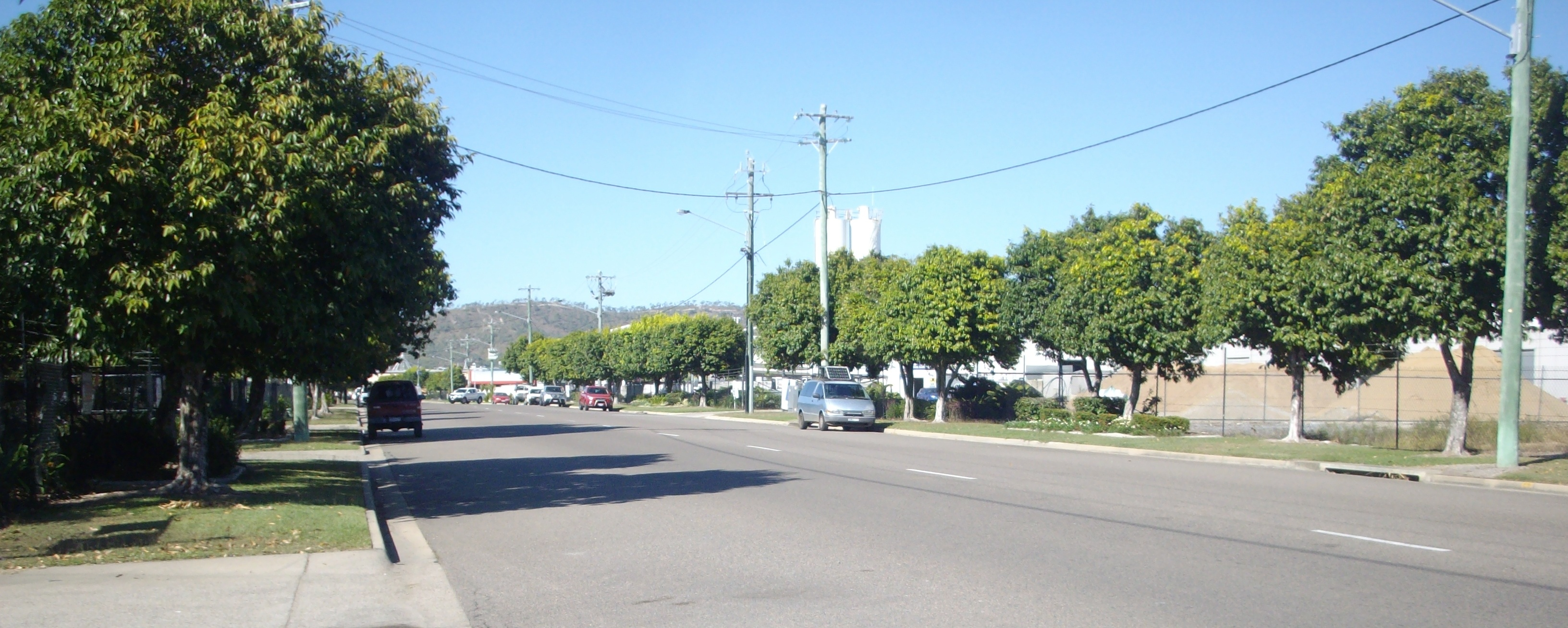
- Webb Drive, Mt St John

- Interactive map of Mount St John
- Coordinates: 19.2486°S 146.7408°E
- Country: Australia
- State: Queensland
- City: Townsville
- LGA: City of Townsville
- Location: 6.7 km (4.2 mi) N of Heatley; 10.7 km (6.6 mi) W of Townsville CBD; 1,345 km (836 mi) NNW of Brisbane

Government
  - State electorate: Townsville
  - Federal division: Herbert

Area
  - Total: 6.2 km^{2} (2.4 sq mi)

Population
  - Total: 103 (2021 census)
  - Density: 16.61/km^{2} (43.0/sq mi)
- Time zone: UTC+10:00 (AEST)
- Postcode: 4818
Suburbs around Mount St John
Bohle	Town Common	Garbutt
Bohle	Mount St John	Garbutt
Bohle	Mount Louisa	Garbutt

Mount St John is an industrial suburb of Townsville in the City of Townsville, Queensland, Australia. In the 2021 census, Mount St John had a population of 103 people.

== Geography ==
The land is flat with the mountain Mount St John in the south-east of the locality (19.2564°S 146.7428°E) at a height of 26 metres (85 ft) above sea level.

The land use is predominantly industrial with the eastern corner of the suburb being part of the Townsville International Airport (which is mostly in neighbouring Garbutt). There is no access from Mount St John into the airport.

There are no residential subdivisions within the locality, but the Coral Coast Tourist Park is at 547 Ingham Road (19.2619°S 146.7484°E).

== History ==
Mount St John is situated in the traditional Wulgurukaba Aboriginal country.

The suburb was named after St John Robinson who founded zoological gardens in the area.

The top of the mountain Mount St John was the site of the Mount St John Anti-Aircraft Battery during World War II. In 2016 the battery's remains were incorporated as a feature of the landscaped garden of a private residence.

== Demographics ==
In the 2016 census, Mount St John had a population of 62 people.

In the 2021 census, Mount St John had a population of 103 people.

== Heritage listings ==
Mount St John has a number of heritage-listed sites, including:

- Mount St John Anti-Aircraft Battery, 43 Toll Street (19.2564°S 146.7428°E)

== Education ==
North Trade Training Centre is a technical college of TAFE Queensland at 763-773 Ingham Road (19.2603°S 146.7276°E).

There are no schools in the suburb. The nearest government primary schools are Garbutt State School in neighbouring Garbutt to the east and Bohlevale State School in Burdell to the west. The nearest government secondary school is Heatley Secondary College in Heatley to the south.

== Facilities ==
Mount St John Wastewater Treatment Plant is a sewage treatment plant in Mount St John Road (19.2541°S 146.7436°E). It is operated by the Townsville City Council. It processes 16,000 kilolitres (570,000 cu ft) of waste water each day and operates continuously through the year. It services the suburbs of Kirwan, the Upper Ross River area, the Northern Beaches, and parts of Garbutt and Currajong. The treated water is then used to irrigate the Rowes Bay golf course or is discharged into Snaggy Creek, a tributary of the Bohle River.
