= Mount St John Anti-Aircraft Battery =

Heritage-listed anti-aircraft battery in Townsville, Australia

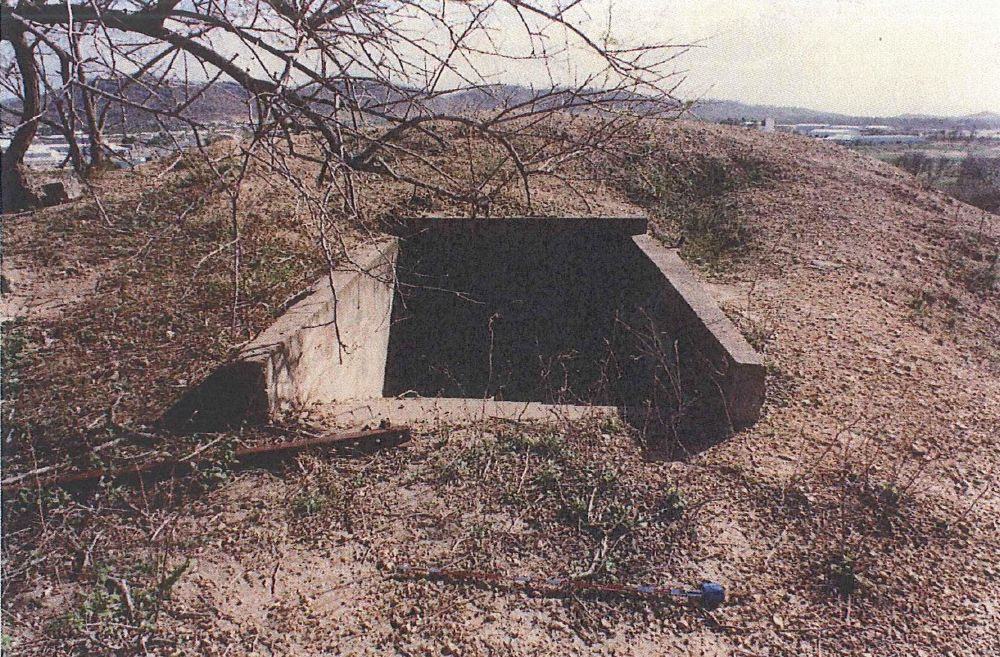
- Station at Mount St John Anti-Aircraft Battery

- Location within Queensland Location within Australia
- 19.2564°S 146.7428°E
- Location: 43 Toll Street, Mount St John, City of Townsville, Queensland, Australia

History
- Design period: 1939–1945 (World War II)
- Built: February 1942 – April 1942

Queensland Heritage Register
- Official name: Y Station, 16 Heavy Anti-Aircraft Battery, No. 2 Station, Gun Station 393, Mount St John Anti-Aircraft Battery
- Type: state heritage (built)
- Designated: 26 November 1999
- Reference no.: 602084
- Significant period: 1942 (fabric); 1942–1945 (historical)
- Significant components: command post, magazine / explosives store, gun emplacement, road/roadway

Mount St John Anti-Aircraft Battery is a heritage-listed fortification at 43 Toll Street, Mount St John, City of Townsville, Queensland, Australia. It was built between February and April 1942. It is also known as Y Station, 16 Heavy Anti-Aircraft Battery and No. 2 Station, Gun Station 393. It was added to the Queensland Heritage Register on 26 November 1999.

== History ==
The Mount St John Anti-Aircraft gun station was constructed between February and April 1942 as part of the World War II air defences of Townsville, in an effort to monitor aircraft entering the nearby Garbutt Aerodrome.

On 7 December 1941, the United States entered World War II following the bombing of Pearl Harbor in Hawaii by Japanese carrier-borne aircraft. The United Kingdom and its Commonwealth had been at war with Germany since September 1939, but now the war was truly global.

Japan attacked the Philippines and Thailand, and advanced through Malaya and the Netherlands East Indies (now Indonesia). Singapore fell on 15 February 1942 and two brigades of the 8th Division of the 2nd Australian Imperial Force (2nd AIF) were captured, while the third brigade was destroyed piecemeal on the islands of Timor, Ambon and New Britain.

The Japanese first bombed Darwin on 19 February 1942, and America's General Douglas MacArthur arrived in Australia on 17 March, after being ordered to leave the Philippines (which fell in early May). At this time Australia appeared in imminent danger of invasion, but two key naval battles reduced this threat. The battle of the Coral Sea, fought 4–8 May, prevented a Japanese invasion force from reaching Port Moresby, and the Battle of Midway, fought in early June 1942, crippled the offensive power of the Japanese aircraft carrier force.

Australia now became the springboard for the Allied attempt to push back the Japanese. General MacArthur moved his General Headquarters, South West Pacific Area (GHQ, SWPA) from Melbourne to Brisbane on 20 July 1942, a day before the Japanese landed on the north coast of New Guinea in the Buna-Gona area and attempted to advance on Port Moresby via the Kokoda Track. In September another Japanese landing force was defeated at Milne Bay, the Japanese were halted at Imita Ridge on the Kokoda track, and the joint Australian-US effort to retake New Guinea began. Queensland played a major role in the build-up of troops and supplies for the counter-offensive.

In late 1942 Townsville was the principle port for those Allied troops serving in the New Guinea campaign and Cleveland Bay between Magnetic Island and Townsville was an important assembly point for shipping. The Australian forces chose Townsville as the Area Combined Headquarters for the North East Area, while the American forces used Townsville as the headquarters of the United States Army Base Section Two and the Fourth Air Depot of the United States Army Air Forces (USAAF). Between 1942 and 1945 the Townsville and Charters Towers region became one of the largest concentrations of airfields, stores, ammunition depots and port operations in the South West Pacific Theatre.

After the raid on Darwin, many felt Townsville, the largest city in the North, would be the next to experience a large-scale raid. However, due to its distance from the front line, it could not be raided by land-based bombers, which had added to the devastation in Darwin. Thus any bombing attack would come from aircraft carriers or long range Kawanishi flying boats.

Garbutt aerodrome was adequately defended. The 16 Heavy Anti-Aircraft (16 HAA) Battery was stationed in Townsville early in the war in the South West Pacific, with two separate units defending the airport and its approaches. No.1 Station, at Rowes Bay south of Pallarenda, was operational by 9 March 1942 with four guns in position. Construction of No.2 Station at Mount St John, located directly west of the Garbutt main north-south runway, commenced in February 1942 and was completed towards the end of April 1942; however, construction of the semi-underground command post did not commence until late 1942. Other Australian Army HAA positions in Townsville were built at Aitkenvale, The Strand, and Jimmy's Lookout (in Rowes Bay).

No.2 Station was Townsville's largest and most modern anti-aircraft battery when completed. Hardly a mountain, more a small hill, the site included four concrete ammunition bunkers, four 3.7" guns of the latest design, and an underground command post and plotting room. The standard (static) HAA gun position used in Queensland during World War II had four hexagonal gun positions, with a semi-underground command post in the centre of the arc of the guns and a magazine for each gun, with all elements built with reinforced concrete. At Mount St John, the 3.7" gun positions consisted of a surface concrete platform, surrounded by a protective earth wall (most of the surrounding earth walls have since been removed). Another permanent type of HAA position used in Queensland had the emplacements sunk into the ground, with concrete walls around the pit, complete with ammunition recesses.

No.2 Station's function was to observe all aircraft movements around Garbutt aerodrome and make sure that all aircraft followed the correct lane of entry. Any aircraft following an incorrect lane was to be fired on as an enemy aircraft. The Mount St John gun station was connected by phone to No. 3 Fighter Sector Headquarters (3FSHQ) Stuart (Operations and Signals Bunker), as well as various other installations and was staffed 24 hours a day. All four guns were in place by 11 March. However open sights, enabling the guns to be fired accurately, were not fitted till 22 March.

At 1206 hours on 21 March 1942 the first Japanese aircraft of World War II was sighted over the city by observers at Kissing Point Battery. It was described in one report as "silvery underneath, wings like a Douglas, with the leading edge being tapered back". Another report described it as being a Japanese MC-20, however this is not feasible as this aircraft did not have the range. The Japanese aircraft that fits the description is the Mitsubishi G3M3; a twin engine bomber/reconnaissance aircraft. Possessing a range of 3,871 miles (6,230 km), this aircraft was specifically designed for fast, long-range reconnaissance. It was the only twin-engine aircraft, which could make the distance from New Guinea, and was code-named Nell by the Allies later in 1942. It is shown on a pre-July aircraft recognition poster as the Type 96 Mitsubishi.

The purpose of these reconnaissance missions was to locate airfields so a future strike could be arranged. It is possible that this particular aircraft was based in Lae or Salamaua, which had fallen on 8 March. US B17's operating out of Cloncurry, Charters Towers and Townsville had bombed both bases at least twice.

The Kissing Point Battery spotted another aircraft the next day at the same time. That both aircraft were sighted at midday was significant; this time of the day was perfect for aerial photographic reconnaissance, as there were no shadows to distort objects on the ground. The Kissing Point Battery rang through to both No.1 and No.2 stations of 16 HAA but discovered the phone lines were down. Even if either unit had spotted the aircraft, they would not have been able to fire accurately, as open sights were not fitted until 22 March, the following day.

The names of the batteries were changed with No.1 Station changed to X Station at Rowes Bay, and No.2 Station to Y Station at Mount St John. The first time both these stations fired on an enemy aircraft was on 1 May 1942. Intelligence recorded that:

"At approximately 0945 hrs 16 A.A. Bty opened fire on enemy Recce aircraft flying at a great height. At approximately 1220 hrs U.S.A.A. Bty. opened fire on hostile aircraft, which made out to sea".

When consulting single unit diaries a more detailed description of what occurred on 1 May emerged:

"Planes were sighted by X Station at Palleranda [sic] at a height of approximately 24,000 feet, heading directly towards the aerodrome at Garbutt. X Station immediately went into action and with the first salvo caused the planes to change direction and climb steeply to 29,000 feet and out of range of the guns. Y Station at Mt St John also went into action at this stage. In all 33 rounds were fired 25 from the station at Pallarenda and 8 from the station at Mount St John".

According to the unit diary, these two aircraft returned at 1140 hrs, releasing a balloon over Garbutt aerodrome at 25,000–30,000 feet (7,600–9,100 m). The balloon descended and blew out to sea, the diary remarking that "tactics proved that they were enemy aircraft". The balloon was a radiosonde, or a dropsonde which was an instrument platform with radio transmitting capabilities. It contained instruments capable of taking air temperature, humidity and pressure measurements at different heights. Its descent provided an indirect measure of wind speed and direction at various atmospheric heights. The data was then transmitted back to the aircraft. This information was vital if a raid was to proceed on a target so that aircraft could bomb accurately. This was either a test run, or the preliminaries to a raid being planned. It is likely that these flying boats were from the 14th Kokutai (Air Group) based in Rabaul Harbour, located today in the East New Britain province of Papua New Guinea.

Mount St John's Y Station was involved in more action. Prior to Townsville's first air raid on the night of 25/26 July 1942, the city received a warning that a raid would soon occur. This clue unfortunately went unheeded by military authorities. For three days prior to the first air raid on the city, AA units were on high alert, with yellow alerts and unidentified aircraft reports occurring more frequently than usual. At 0920 hrs on 22 July 1942, unidentified aircraft were seen flying at 25,000 feet (7,600 m) over Townsville. At 1000 hrs, Y Station at Mount St John reported "white balloon at 25,000 feet slowly descending". Once again the Japanese used dropsondes to record wind speed and direction at certain heights for a planned raid on Townsville.

Townsville was attacked three times during late July 1942, by the 2nd Group of 14 Kokutai Japanese Naval Air Force, using Kawanishi H8K (Emily) four-engine flying boats based at Rabaul. On the night of 25/26 July two Emilys dropped bombs in the sea off Townsville's wharves. However, Y Station did not fire until a second raid early in the morning of 28 July. At 0220 hrs that day searchlights at Rowes Bay picked up a lone Emily at 10,000 feet (3,000 m). After 20 rounds were fired from Y Station an explosion close to the nose of the aircraft occurred, causing it to drop its bomb load in an uninhabited area of nearby Many Peaks Range. During the third raid on the morning of 29 July 1942 an Emily dropped seven bombs in Cleveland Bay and one on a paddock at Oonoonba, and was intercepted and damaged by two US fighter aircraft.

The minutes of meeting 126 of the Allied Works Council (Queensland Division), 1 December 1942 referred to the Mount St John position as Gun Station 393. On 31 July 1944 the 16th HAA Battery disbanded. Since the end of World War II, the Mount St John gun station has been sold and is now owned by a private company. Industrial development of the surrounding area has occurred, and parts of the west and east sides of Mount St John were quarried between the 1950s and the 1980s. In the later part of this period sections of one gun platform and the stairs of the two exposed magazines were removed and dumped nearby within the heritage boundary.

== Description ==
The anti-aircraft gun station on the summit of Mount St John is located 2.3 kilometres (1.4 mi) directly west of the Garbutt main north-south runway. The site is located on the road to the Townsville City Council's sewerage treatment plant off the Bruce Highway (Ingham Road).

In 1999, physical remains of the Mount St John site comprised four ammunition magazines, four gun positions and a semi-underground command post/plotting room, all constructed from reinforced concrete. A fifth gun platform, for a light AA gun, is located just east of the command post, and the main camp site for Y Station was located at the base of the hill to the south of the gun emplacements.

All magazines are of identical size, single-roomed and originally located underground with semi-concealed stairways, single steel doors and two metal ventilators on the roof. Two have had soil around them removed and are completely exposed. The stairs on these same two have been removed and are lying nearby. Mounds north of the gun emplacements may also contain material discarded from the station. The four gun positions are clearly visible. Two are hexagonally shaped platforms, the outer walkway on one being partly demolished, the remaining two appear to be circular, but originally would have been hexagonal. The anti-aircraft guns were of 3.7-inch (94 mm) calibre and all four gun platforms still have the metal mounting rods in place. The semi-underground command post/plotting room is structurally intact and still possesses its metal entrance door. There is also evidence of a service road winding up the south side of the mountain.

== Heritage listing ==
The Mount St John Anti-Aircraft Battery was listed on the Queensland Heritage Register on 26 November 1999 having satisfied the following criteria.

The place is important in demonstrating the evolution or pattern of Queensland's history.

The Mount St John Anti-Aircraft Battery, a complex of gun positions, magazines and a command post (operational in April 1942) is important in demonstrating the measures taken to defend Townsville from Japanese air attack during World War II.

Queensland was the main staging area for the Allied effort to drive the Japanese out of New Guinea, and Townsville provided vital port, airfield supply and supply facilities for Allied forces during the war in the South West Pacific. Due to its strategic importance, the city was bombed three times by Japanese long-range flying boats in July 1942, and Y Station fired at a Japanese aircraft during the second raid.

The former Y Station of HAA is one of a series of extant World War II structures remaining in Townsville. It differs from the others in that it is the only remaining structure which was involved in action against hostile aircraft before and after the battle of the Coral Sea (fought in early May 1942).

The place has potential to yield information that will contribute to an understanding of Queensland's history.

Underground deposits of material on the site, buried since the end of the war, have the potential to reveal more information on the operation of HAA positions in Queensland.

The place is important in demonstrating the principal characteristics of a particular class of cultural places.

The Mount St John Anti-Aircraft Battery is a good example of the standard HAA gun station complex used throughout Queensland, with four 3.7-inch (94 mm) gun positions (in this case of a surface emplacement type), four magazines (two still buried), a semi-underground command post, a Light Anti-Aircraft (LAA) position and camp site remnants at the base of the hill. The old road formation on the south side of the hill is also a part of the wartime infrastructure, and demonstrates how the site was accessed. Y Station is the most intact surviving example of the HAA defences of Townsville, and is one of the most intact HAA positions in Queensland.

A number of HAA sites in Queensland were sited on high ground, when it was available. Y Station's location demonstrates its intended role in protecting Garbutt airfield to the north-east; therefore the sight lines between it and the airfield are important.
