= Garbutt, Queensland =

Garbutt Townsville, Queensland
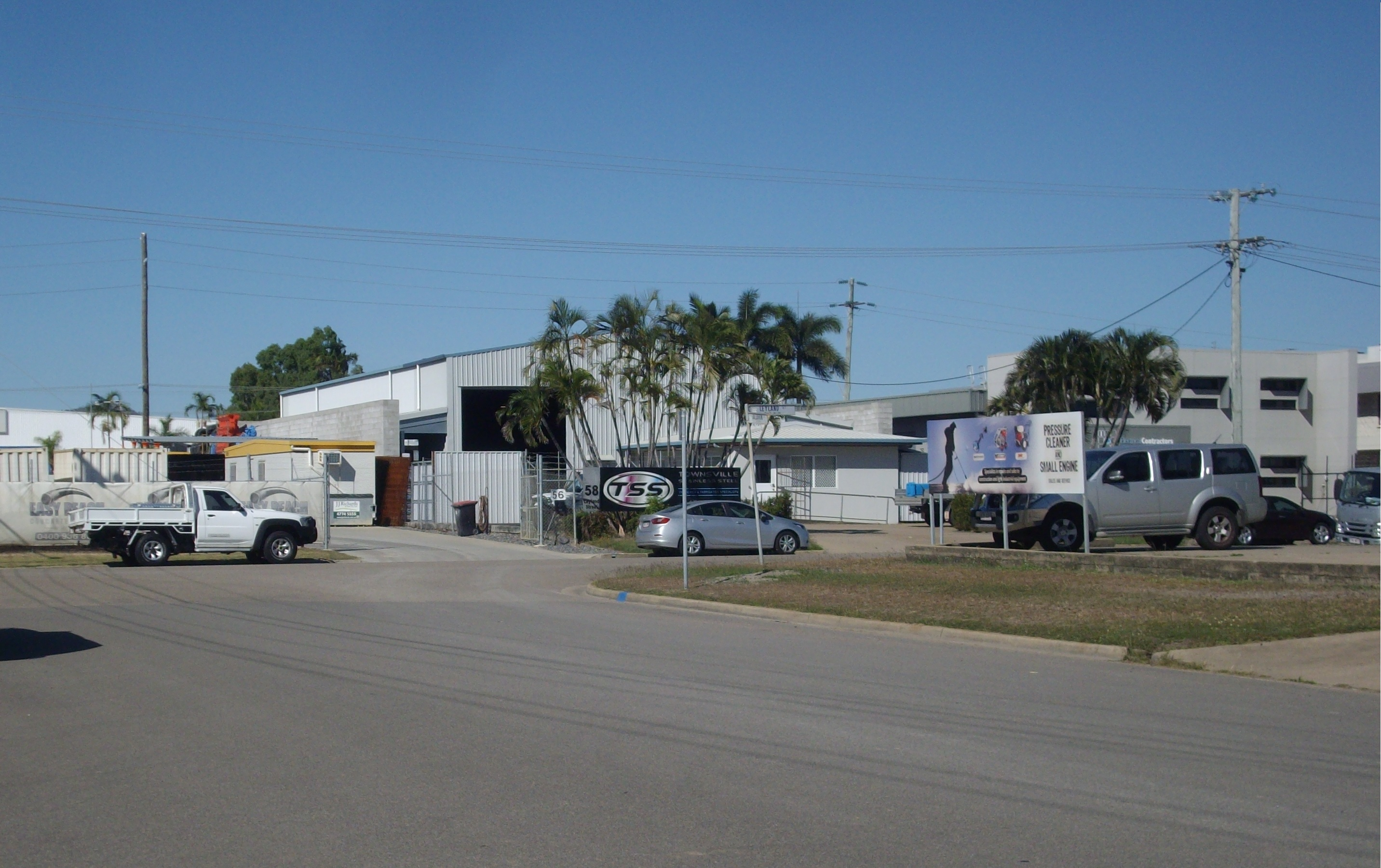
- View towards Leyland Street from Lazzaroni Street

- Coordinates: 19.2627°S 146.7658°E
- Population: 2,309 (2021 census)
  - Density: 192.4/km^{2} (498.4/sq mi)
- Postcode(s): 4814
- Area: 12.0 km^{2} (4.6 sq mi)
- Time zone: AEST (UTC+10:00)
- Location: 5.9 km (4 mi) W of Townsville CBD; 1,335 km (830 mi) NNW of Brisbane
- LGA(s): City of Townsville
- State electorate(s): Townsville
- Federal division(s): Herbert
Suburbs around Garbutt:
| Mount St John | Town Common | Rowes Bay |
| Mount Louisa | Garbutt | Belgian Gardens |
| Heatley | Vincent; Currajong | West End |

Garbutt is a suburb of Townsville in the City of Townsville, Queensland, Australia. It is home to the Townsville International Airport and RAAF Townsville. In the 2021 census, Garbutt had a population of 2,309 people.

== Geography ==
Only the eastern part of the suburb is residential. The southern part of the suburb is an industrial estate. The northern part of the suburb is an airport precinct, consisting of:

- Townsville International Airport (formerly known as Garbutt Airport) which has its entrance on Coral Sea Drive (19.2562°S 146.7711°E)
- RAAF Base Townsville, which has its entrance off Ingham Road (19.2630°S 146.7685°E)
- a heliport (19.2563°S 146.7592°E)
- Townsville station of the Bureau of Meteorology

The North Coast railway line enters the suburb from the east (West End) and exits to the west (Mount Louisa). The suburb is served by Garbutt railway station (19.2656°S 146.7744°E).

North Townsville Road runs through from west to east, and Garbutt–Upper Ross Road runs along the southern boundary. Douglas–Garbutt Road enters from the south.

== History ==
Garbutt is situated in the traditional Wulgurukaba Aboriginal country.

Garbutt Methodist church officially opened on Sunday 9 February 1936 on the corner of Ingham Road and Meenan Street. A new Methodist church was opened in 1964, becoming a Uniting Church following the amalgamation of the Methodist, Presbyterian and Congregational denominations. The congregation of the West End Uniting Church decided to join the Garbutt Uniting Church, but the continued growth of the congregation at Garbutt necessitated a move in 1986 to a new church called House of Praise at 485 Bayswater Road in Mount Louisa.

The suburb takes its name from the railway station which was originally known as Garbutts Siding and renamed Garbutt by the Queensland Railways Department on 26 January 1940. The siding served the butchering firm established by Charles Overend Garbutt (1848–1905), a Queensland pastoralist whose sons had settled in Townsville.

RAAF Base Townsville was established on 15 October 1940. The No 24 (General Purpose) Squadron was relocated from RAAF Station Amberley to Townsville. The United States Army Air Corps (USAAC) and the United States Army Air Force (USAAF) were based at Townsville during World War II.

St Theresa's Catholic Church opened in 1968.

From 1 February 2020, the Townsville station of the Bureau of Meteorology became fully automated.

== Demographics ==
In the 2016 census, Garbutt had a population of 2,396 people. Aboriginal and Torres Strait Islander people made up 13.1% of the population. 72.2% of people were born in Australia and 78.1% of people spoke only English at home. The most common responses for religion were No Religion 27.6% and Catholic 21.5%.

In the 2021 census, Garbutt had a population of 2,309 people.

== Education ==
Garbutt State School is a government primary (Prep-6) school for boys and girls at 76 Chandler Street (19.2618°S 146.7755°E). In 2018, the school had an enrolment of 91 students with 11 teachers (9 full-time equivalent) and 9 non-teaching staff (6 full-time equivalent).

There is no secondary school in Garbutt. The nearest government secondary school is Pimlico State High School in Gulliver to the south.

== Amenities ==
=== Shopping ===
- Garbutt Shopping Village

=== Churches ===
- St Theresa's Catholic Church, 62-66 Lonerganne Street (19.2635°S 146.7753°E)

=== Parks ===
- Harold Phillips Park
- Melrose Park
- Spilsbury Park

=== Community groups ===
The Magnetic Garbutt branch of the Queensland Country Women's Association meets at the CWA Hall at 42 Lancaster Street (19.2593°S 146.7780°E).

== Attractions ==
RAAF Townsville Aviation Heritage Centre is a museum devoted to the military aviation heritage of North Queensland. It is at 487 Ingham Road (19.2630°S 146.7668°E). Since March 2020, it has been temporarily closed due to the COVID-19 pandemic.
