= Bohle, Queensland =

Bohle Townsville, Queensland
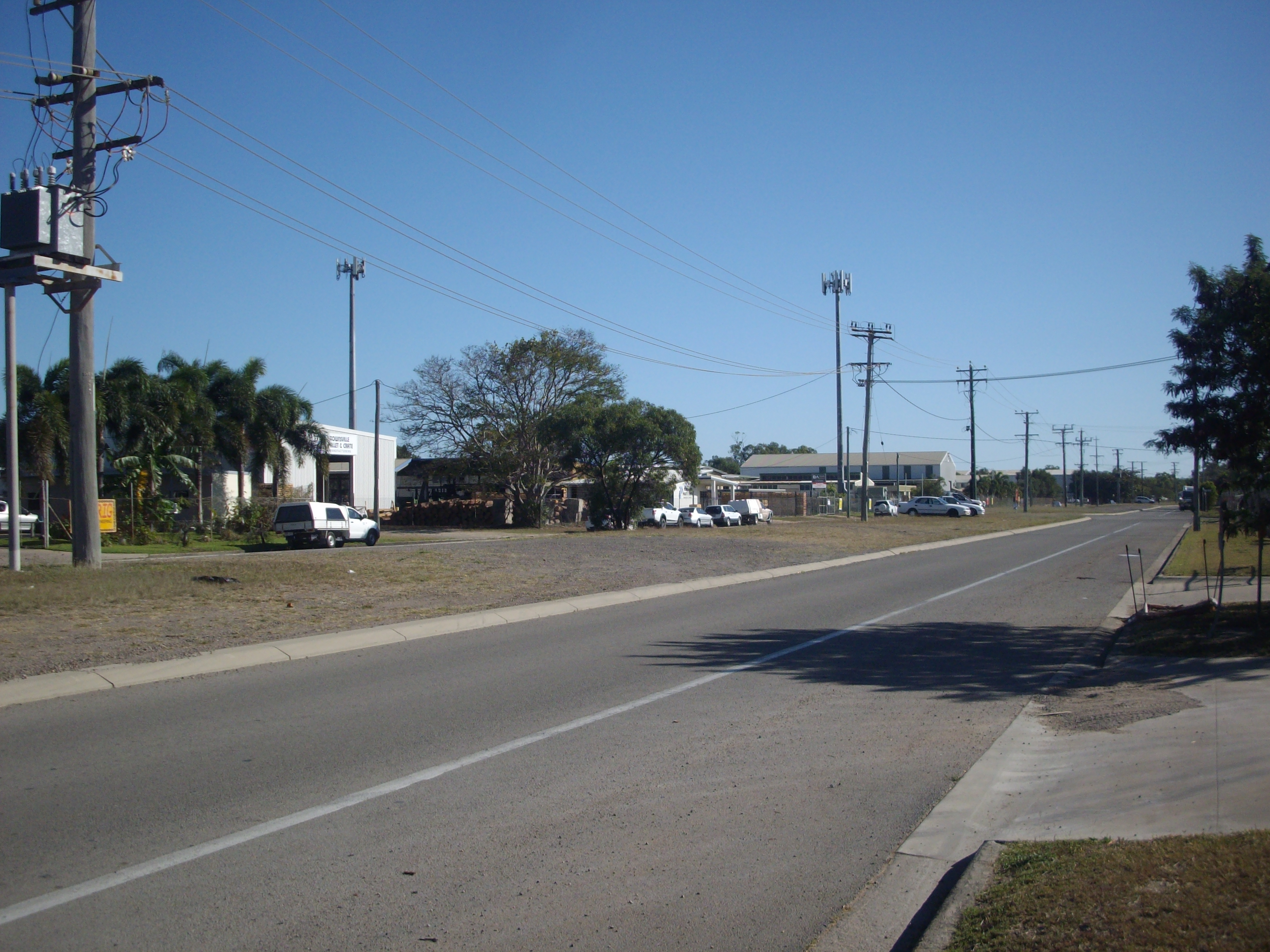
- Enterprise Street, Bohle

- Coordinates: 19.2458°S 146.7210°E
- Population: 121 (2021 census)
  - Density: 15.71/km^{2} (40.7/sq mi)
- Postcode(s): 4818
- Area: 7.7 km^{2} (3.0 sq mi)
- Time zone: AEST (UTC+10:00)
- Location: 12.0 km (7 mi) W of Townsville CBD; 1,375 km (854 mi) NNW of Brisbane
- LGA(s): City of Townsville
- State electorate(s): Townsville
- Federal division(s): Herbert
Suburbs around Bohle:
Mount Low	Town Common	Town Common
Burdell	Bohle	Mount St John
Shaw	Cosgrove	Mount Louisa

Bohle is a northern suburb in the City of Townsville, Queensland, Australia. In the 2021 census, Bohle had a population of 121 people.

== Geography ==
The southern half of the suburb is predominaly occupied by the Bohle Industrial Estate (19.2578°S 146.7140°E). There is a small residential area around Clay Street (19.2628°S 146.71551°E) and a caravan park in Ingham Road (19.2625°S 146.7138°E).

The northern half of the suburb is a restricted area occupied by the Bohle Transmitter Station, an Australian Defence Force facility occupying 484 hectares (1,200 acres) with a transmission mast (19.2378°S 146.7223°E) which forms part of the Modernised High Frequency Communications System.

== History ==
Bohle is situated in the traditional Wulgurukaba Aboriginal country. The suburb takes its name from the Bohle River, which was named after Henry Mackinnon Bohle (1842–1923), a pioneer who brought cattle to the district in 1863. On 1 September 1967 the district was first named by the Queensland Place Names Board, becoming a suburb on 12 June 1992.

Bohlevale State School opened on 20 November 1911. As at 2020, it is within the neighbouring suburb of Burdell.

== Demographics ==
In the 2016 census, Bohle had a population of 85 people.

In the 2021 census, Bohle had a population of 121 people.

== Education ==
There are no schools in Bohle. The nearest government primary school is Bohlevale State School in neighbouring Burdell to the west. The nearest government secondary schools are Northern Beaches State High School in Deeragun to the west and Heatley Secondary College in Heatley to the south-east.
