= Town Common, Queensland =

Town Common
- Suburb
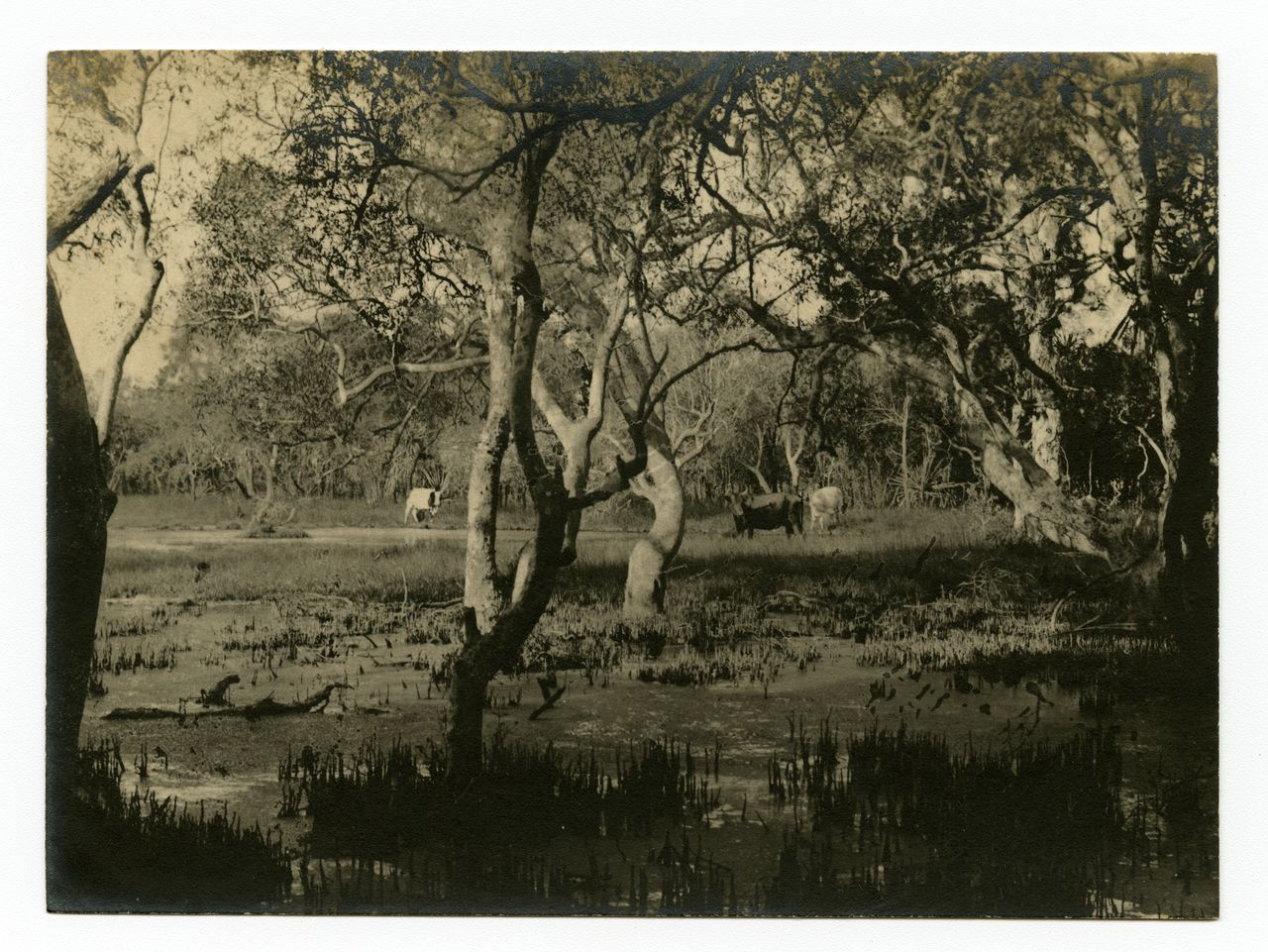
- Town Common, 1892

- Interactive map of Town Common
- Coordinates: 19.2205°S 146.7400°E
- Country: Australia
- State: Queensland
- City: Townsville
- LGA: City of Townsville
- Location: 12.5 km (7.8 mi) NW of Townsville CBD; 1,348 km (838 mi) NNW of Brisbane

Government
  - State electorate: Townsville
  - Federal division: Herbert

Area
  - Total: 37.6 km^{2} (14.5 sq mi)

Population
  - Total: 3 (SAL 2021)
- Time zone: UTC+10:00 (AEST)
- Postcode: 4810
Suburbs around Town Common
Coral Sea	Shelly Beach	Pallarenda
Bushland Beach; Mount Low	Town Common	Coral Sea
Bohle	Mount St John; Garbutt	Rowes Bay

Town Common is a coastal suburb of Townsville in the City of Townsville, Queensland, Australia. It is locally known as "The Common". In the 2021 census, Town Common had "no people or a very low population".

== Geography ==
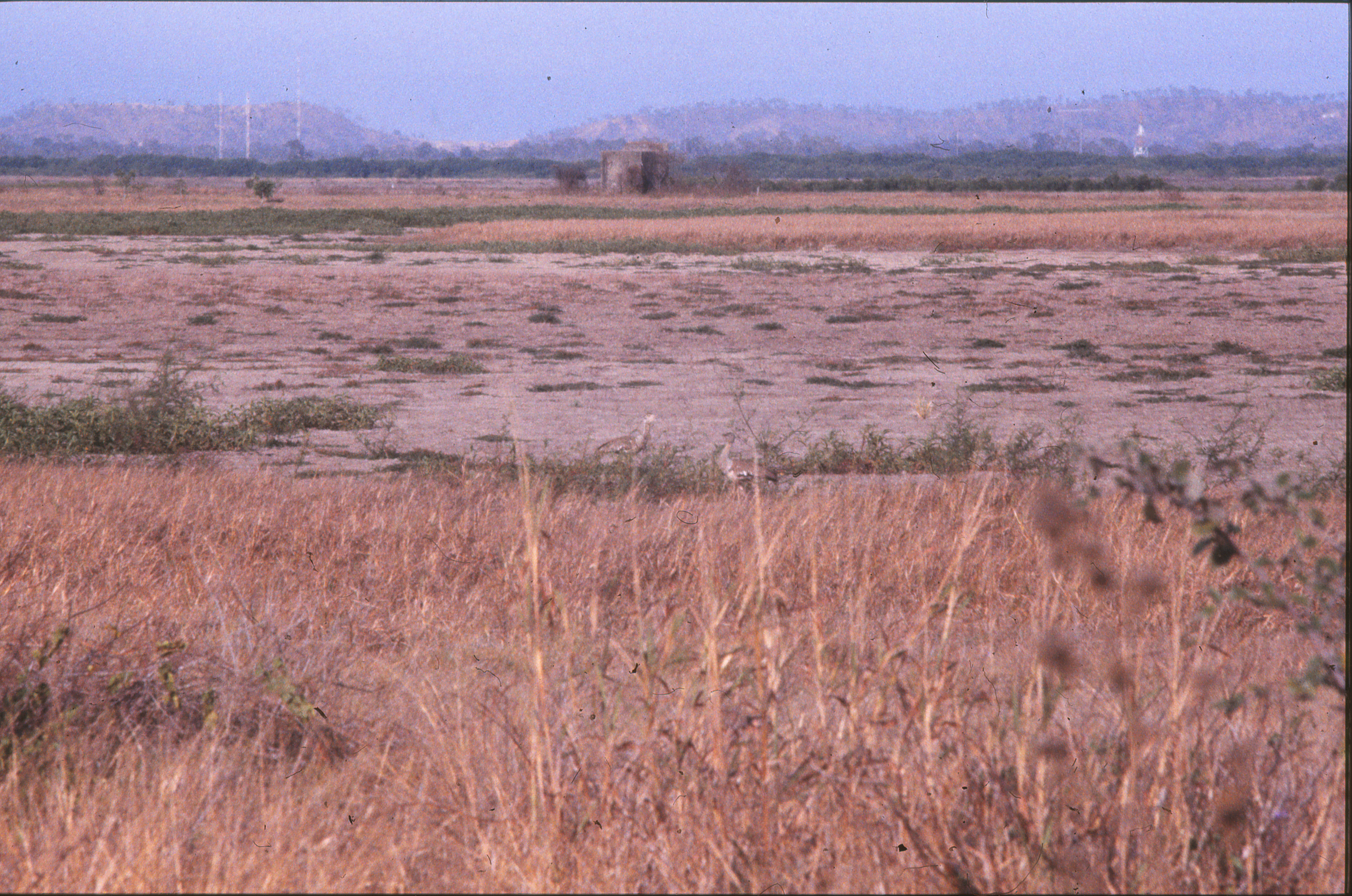
The wetlands that cover a majority of Town Common.

Town Common is bounded by the Bohle River to the west, by the Coral Sea to the north-west and east, and Townsville Airport (Garbutt) to the south. Most of the land is flat and at sea level with the exception of Mount Marlow (19.1919°S 146.7409°E) in the Many Peaks Range in the north-east of the suburb which rises to 213 metres (699 ft). The land in the suburb is mostly undeveloped with much of land contained within the Townsville Town Common Conservation Park (19.2064°S 146.7431°E). The western part of the suburb is a floodplain created by a mangrove-lined network of tributaries of the Bohle River.

Shelly Beach (19.1809°S 146.7494°E) is at the northern coast of the suburb, but is not accessible by road.

The developed land is in the south-east of the locality consists of a golf course, the Garden Settlement Aged Care Village on Cape Pallarenda Road (19.2171°S 146.7760°E), and a park.

The golf course is irrigated with treated waste water from the Mount St John Wastewater Treatment Plant in Mount St John.

== History ==
The wetlands and lowlands of Town Common the result of sand dune formation and water catchment drainage processes including erosion and sedimentation over thousands of years. Town Common was gazetted in 1869 as common land for the people of Townsville (established in 1864). In 1900 part of the wetlands was established as a sanitary reserve. In 1914 a pasturage reserve was established.

In August 2016, Blue Care who operated the aged care village opened a new facility at Mount Louisa and transferred the existing aged care village residents to this new location. The structure of the aged care village remains abandoned in Town Common.

== Demographics ==
In the 2011 census, Town Common had a population of 163 people. The median age of the residents was 81 years, reflecting that the only residential land in the suburb is an aged care village.

In the 2016 census, Town Common had a population of 71 people with a median age of 85 years, being residents of the aged care village.

In the 2021 census, Town Common had "no people or a very low population", due to the aged care centre closing.

== Education ==
There are no schools in Town Common. The nearest government primary school is Belgian Gardens State School in Belgian Gardens to the south-east. The nearest government secondary school is Townsville State High School in Railway Estate to the south-east.

== Amenities ==
Robertson Park is along the coast off Cape Pallarenda Drive (19.2137°S 146.7762°E)

Rowes Bay Golf Club is in Emmerson Street (19.2270°S 146.7754°E).
