= Soroptimist Park =

Park in Rowes Bay, Townsville, Australia

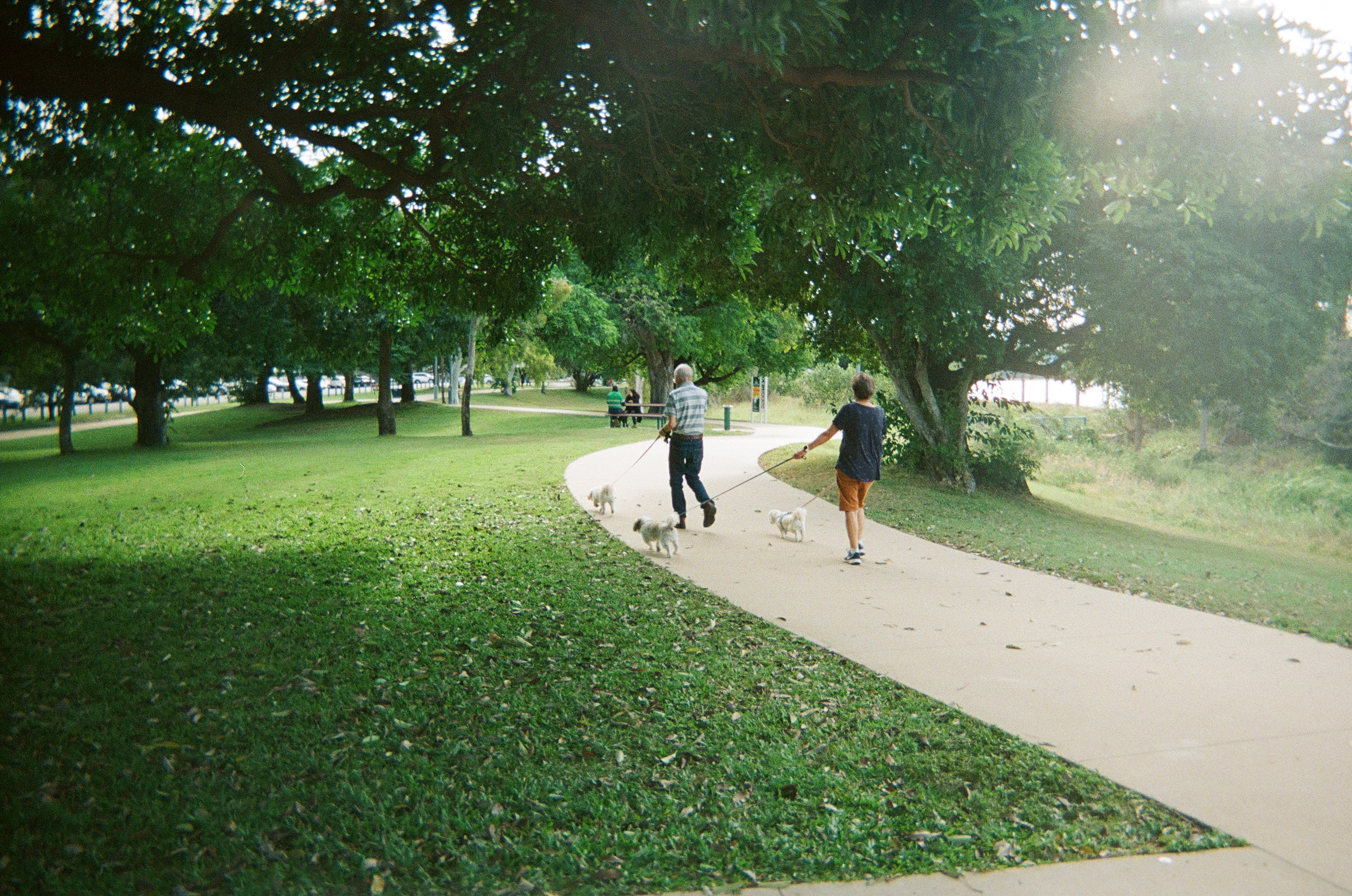
- The park in winter
- Interactive map of Soroptimist Park
- Type: Foreshore park
- Location: Rowes Bay, Townsville, Australia
- Coordinates: 19°14′35.21″S 146°47′38.56″E

Soroptimist Park is a foreshore park located in the suburb of Rowes Bay, Townsville, Australia.

== Attractions ==
It contains lawns, barbecue areas, shade areas and an adventure playground, specifically designed to be suitable for all children, including those with disabilities. The park also contains some attractive Australian sculptures, added in 1988 as an Australian Bicentennial project. Further public art, in the form of mosaic tile works, were completed in 1994 as part of the International Year of the Child. The club of Soroptimist International of Townsville Inc. was the instigator of Soroptimist Park.

== History ==
In 1979 the land on which the park stands was gazetted as a future Adventure Playground. The Soroptimist International Club Townsville (SIT) made application to develop the site. This was achieved when in 1984 the Federal Government introduced Community Employment Programs (C.E.P.) and awarded $130,000 to the club who worked with the Council’s Parks Dept. Because the park was designed to benefit children with disabilities donations became tax deductible and materials sales tax exempt. Twelve unemployed workers, strictly in categories, male, female, handicapped and indigenous were recruited to work on the project. CEP guidelines allowed no machinery to be used and the project was guided by a leading-hand foreman (a skilled stonemason) and supervised by the Soroptimists. Careful planning and operation ensured minimal disruption to the character of the land. Irrigation equipment was installed by hand and 750 meters of winding concrete paths wide enough for two wheelchairs to pass were mixed and poured by hand. A center line brick track assisted the visually disabled and graphic

=== Soroptimist International ===
Soroptimist International is a worldwide organization for women in management and professions, working through service projects to advance human rights and the status of women.

== Gallery ==
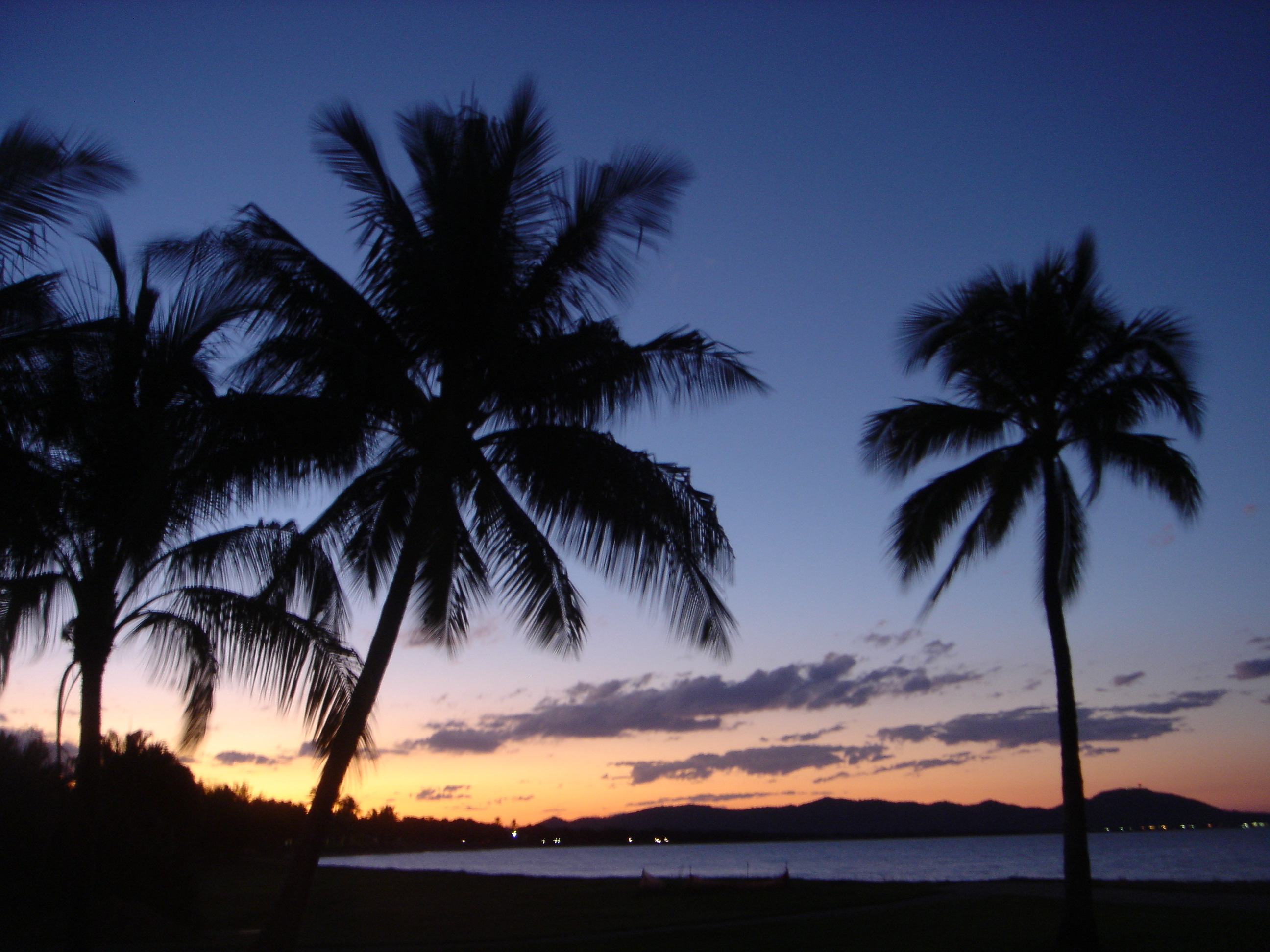
Dusk at Soroptimist Park, Rowes Bay; looking northwards to Cape Pallarenda Conservation Park.

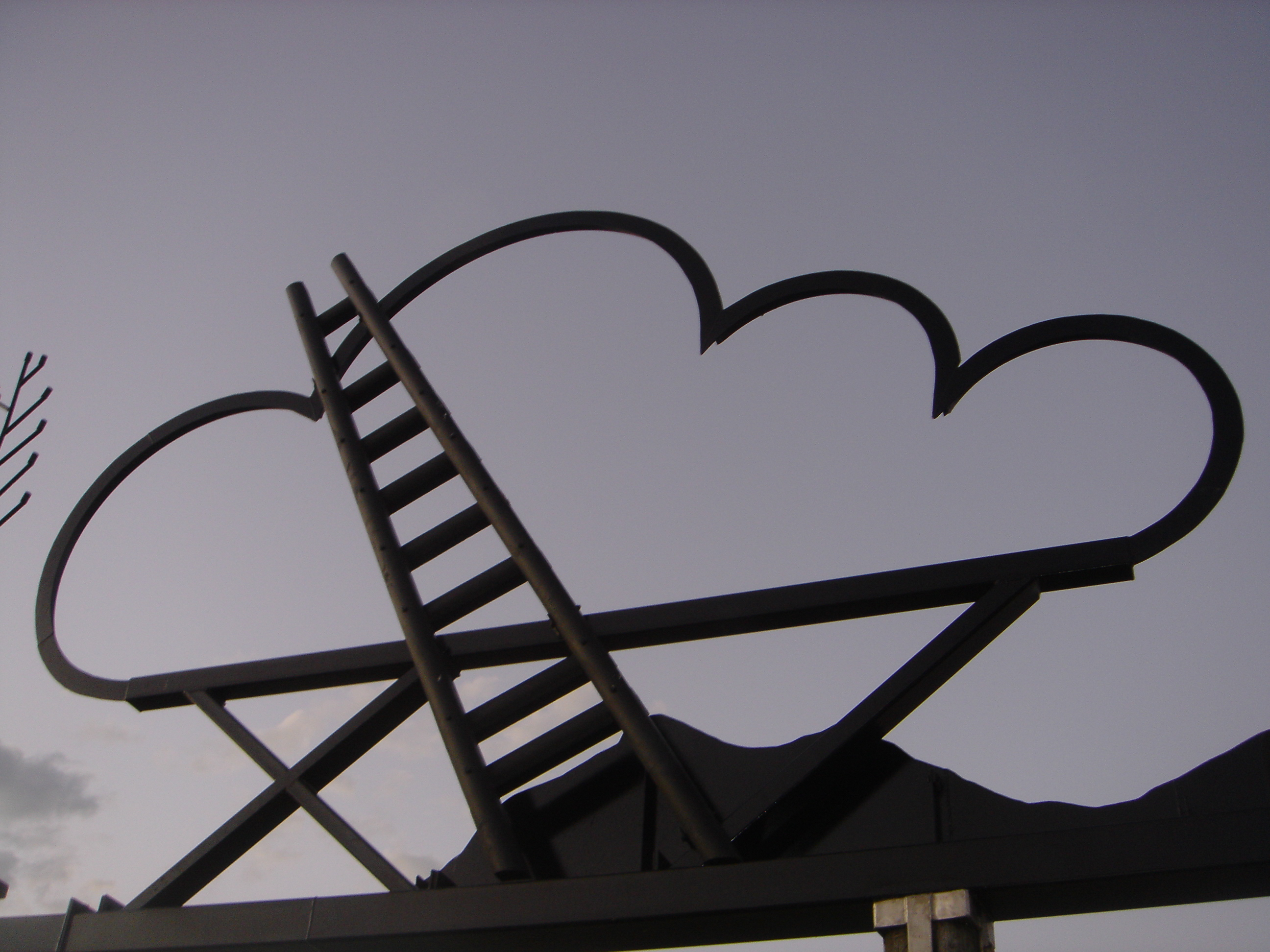
Detail of public art sculpture, Soroptimist Park, Rowes Bay, Queensland.

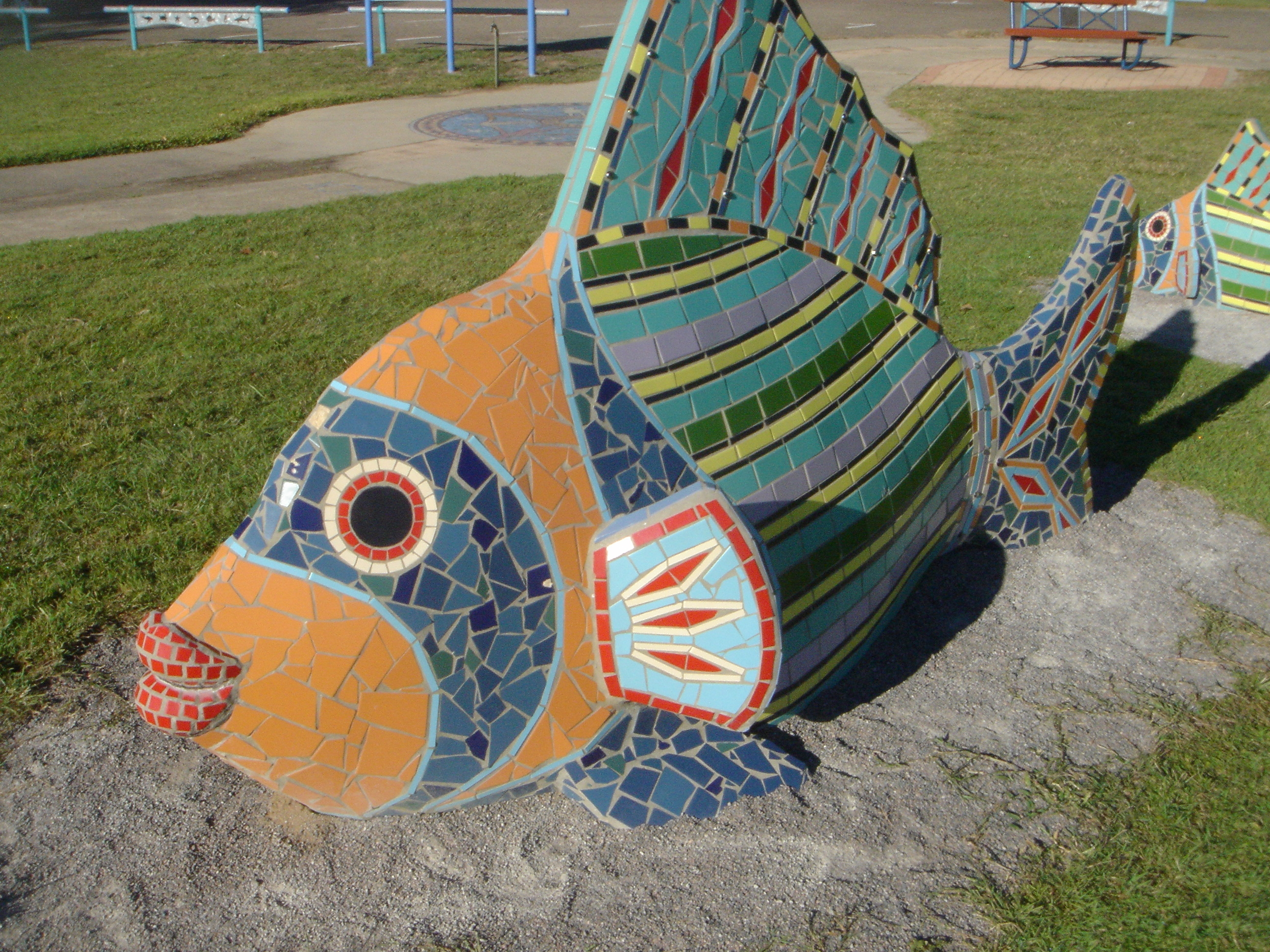
Mosaic public art in the park.
