= Shaw, Queensland =

Shaw
- Suburb
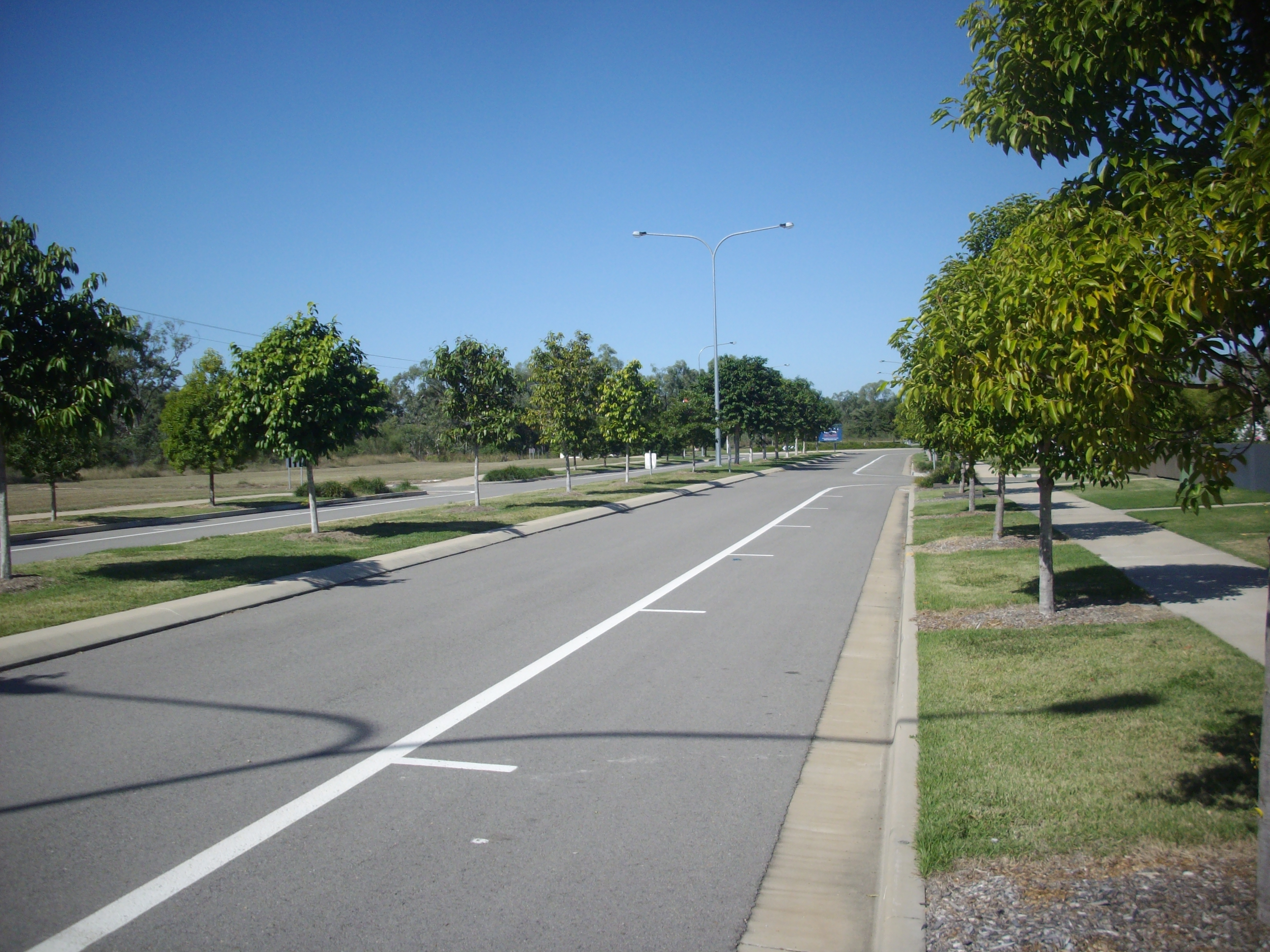
- Greater Ascot Avenue, Shaw

- Interactive map of Shaw
- Coordinates: 19.2794°S 146.6994°E
- Country: Australia
- State: Queensland
- City: Townsville
- LGA: City of Townsville
- Location: 13.8 km (8.6 mi) W of Townsville CBD; 1,375 km (854 mi) NNW of Brisbane
- Established: 1991

Government
  - State electorate: Hinchinbrook
  - Federal division: Herbert

Area
  - Total: 7.6 km^{2} (2.9 sq mi)

Population
  - Total: 760 (2021 census)
  - Density: 100.0/km^{2} (259/sq mi)
- Time zone: UTC+10:00 (AEST)
- Postcode: 4818
Suburbs around Shaw
Deeragun	Burdell	Bohle; Cosgrove
Bohle Plains	Shaw	Mount Louisa
Bohle Plains	Bohle Plains	Kirwan

Shaw is a locality in the City of Townsville, Queensland, Australia. In the 2021 census, Shaw had a population of 760 people.

== Geography ==
Shaw Road runs through from south to north, and North Townsville Road runs along the northern boundary.

== History ==
Shaw is situated in the traditional Wulgurukaba Aboriginal country. The district was named on 27 July 1991.

Historically a rural area, since 2022, the Townsville City Council has approved the release of new residential lots.

St Benedict's Catholic School opened with 163 students in January 2018.

Mary Help of Christians Catholic College opened in 2025.

== Demographics ==
In the 2016 census, Shaw had a population of 550 people.

In the 2021 census, Shaw had a population of 760 people.

== Education ==
St Benedict's Catholic School is a co-educational Catholic primary (Prep–6) school at 890 Dalrymple Road (19.2868°S 146.7325°E).

Mary Help of Christians Catholic College is a co-educational Catholic secondary school (7–12) at At 1 Bishop Putney Avenue (19.2902°S 146.7012°E).

There are no government schools in Shaw. The nearest government primary schools are Bohlevale State School in neighbouring Burdell to the north-west and The Willows State School in neighbouring Kirwan to the south-west. The nearest government secondary schools are Northern Beaches State High School in Deeragun and Kirwan State High School in Kirwan.
