= Cosgrove, Queensland =

Cosgrove
- Suburb
- Interactive map of Cosgrove
- Coordinates: 19.2716°S 146.7133°E
- Country: Australia
- State: Queensland
- City: Townsville
- LGA: City of Townsville
- Location: 6.7 km (4.2 mi) SE of Deeragun; 12.9 km (8.0 mi) W of Townsville CBD; 1,346 km (836 mi) NNW of Brisbane

Government
  - State electorate: Townsville
  - Federal division: Herbert

Area
  - Total: 3.6 km^{2} (1.4 sq mi)

Population
  - Total: 665 (2021 census)
  - Density: 184.7/km^{2} (478/sq mi)
- Time zone: UTC+10:00 (AEST)
- Postcode: 4818
Suburbs around Cosgrove
Burdell	Bohle	Mount Louisa
Shaw	Cosgrove	Mount Louisa
Shaw	Mount Louisa	Mount Louisa

Cosgrove is a suburb of Townsville in the City of Townsville, Queensland, Australia. In the 2021 census, Cosgrove had a population of 665 people.

== Geography ==
Cosgrove is bordered by the North Coast railway line to the north with the North Townsville Road (formerly the Bruce Highway) running parallel and immediately south of the railway line. The Bohle River forms the western boundary.

== History ==
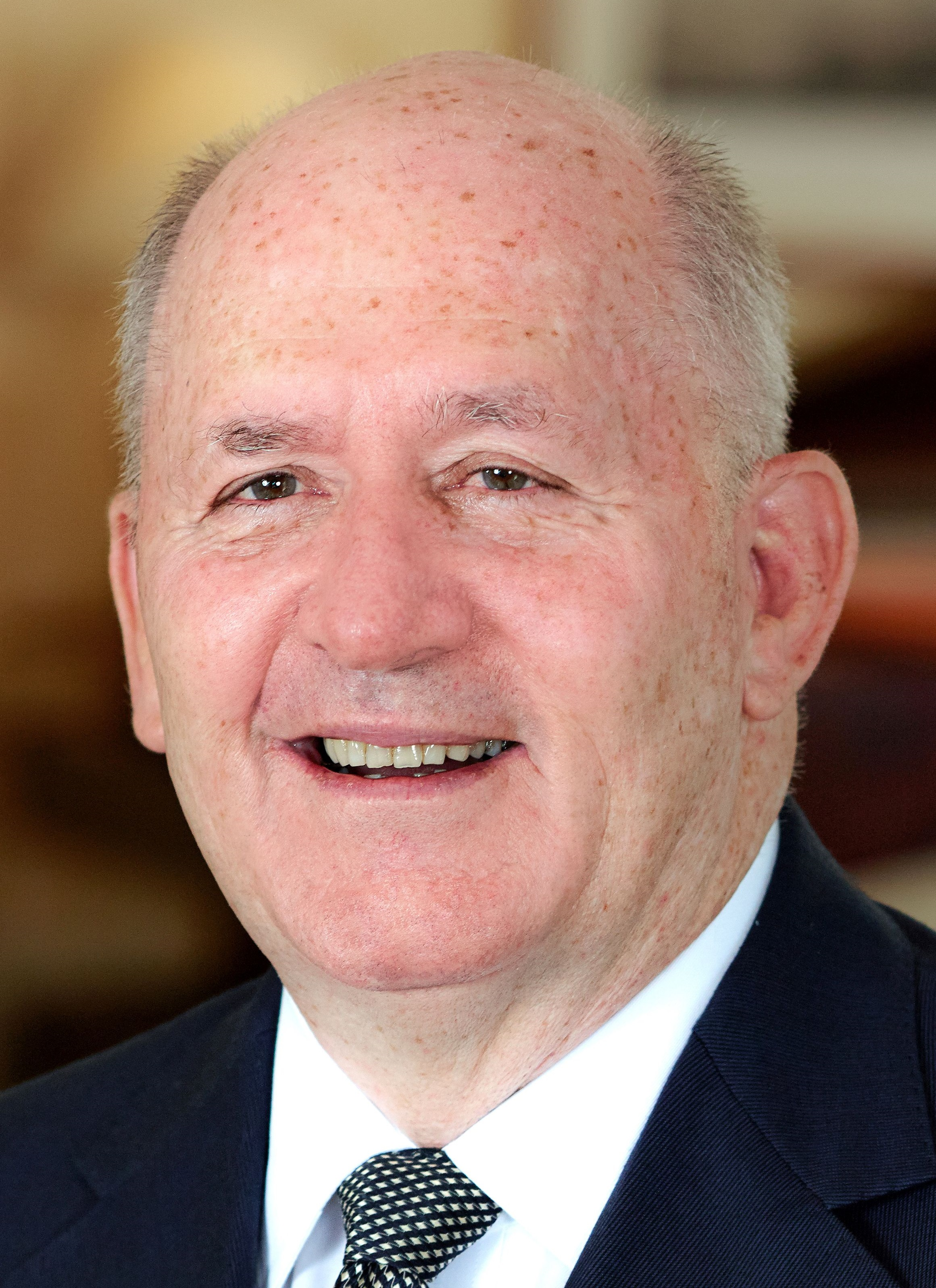
Sir Peter Cosgrove

The suburb was named after General Sir Peter Cosgrove, the former head of the Australian Defence Force and leader of Queensland Government taskforce for the rebuilding of Innisfail region after cyclone Larry in March 2006.

== Demographics ==
In the 2016 census, Cosgrove had a population of 285 people.

In the 2021 census, Cosgrove had a population of 665 people.

== Facilities ==
The Reverend Charles Harris Diversionary Centre is located on Abattoir Road (19.2734°S 146.7134°E). It is a 50-bed facility to provide a place of safety and monitoring for Indigenous people affected by alcohol as an alternative to being held in the Townsville police watch house.

== Education ==
There are no schools in Cosgrove. The nearest government primary school is Bohlevale State School in neighbouring Burdell to the north-west. The nearest government secondary school is Northern Beaches State High School in Deeragun to the north-west.
