= Kirwan, Queensland =

Kirwan Townsville, Queensland
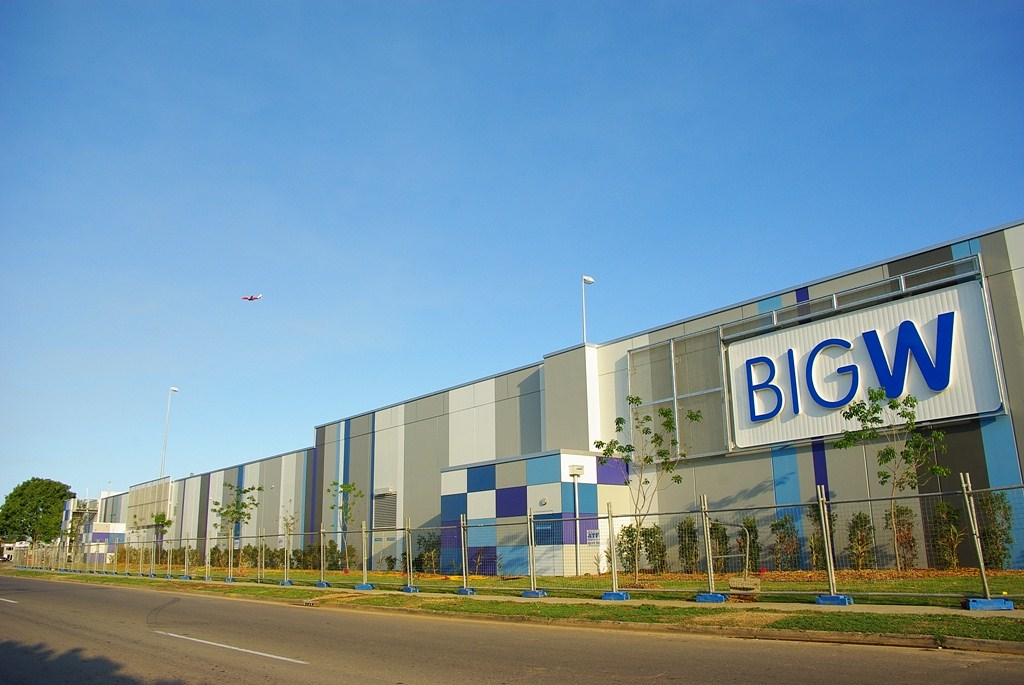
- Big W during construction, 2008

- Coordinates: 19.3002°S 146.7238°E
- Population: 20,780 (2021 census)
  - Density: 1,807/km^{2} (4,680/sq mi)
- Postcode(s): 4817
- Area: 11.5 km^{2} (4.4 sq mi)
- Time zone: AEST (UTC+10:00)
- Location: 11.9 km (7 mi) WSW of Townsville CBD; 1,361 km (846 mi) NNW of Brisbane
- LGA(s): City of Townsville
- State electorate(s): Thuringowa
- Federal division(s): Herbert
Suburbs around Kirwan:
Shaw	Mount Louisa	Heatley
Bohle Plains	Kirwan	Cranbrook
Condon	Thuringowa Central	Douglas

Kirwan is a suburb in the City of Townsville, Queensland, Australia. In the 2021 census, Kirwan had a population of 20,780 people.

== Geography ==
Kirwan is a primarily residential suburb but includes some commercial property, primarily concentrated along Thuringowa Drive.

Garbutt–Upper Ross Road runs through from north to south, and Ross River Road runs along most of the southern boundary.

== History ==
The suburb of Kirwan was established in 1968 as the northernmost of a series of new suburbs along the western side of the Upper Ross River. It was officially named on 1 March 1969 and took its name from an early farming family in the region. Prior to suburban development, Kirwan had been farmed and had also been the site of air force activity during World War II.

Kirwan State School opened in 1977 and Kirwan State High School opened in 1979. Ryan Catholic College, which serves both primary and secondary students, was also founded in 1979. The Willows State School was established in the suburb in 1997.

== Demographics ==
In the 2016 census, Kirwan had a population of 21,418 people. Aboriginal and Torres Strait Islander people made up 8.5% of the population. 82.4% of people were born in Australia. The next most common countries of birth were New Zealand 2.5%, England 2.4%, Philippines 1.0% and Papua New Guinea 0.6%. 88.2% of people spoke only English at home. Other languages spoken at home included Italian at 0.5%. The most common responses for religion were Catholic 29.7%, No Religion 25.6% and Anglican 16.2%.

In the 2021 census, Kirwan had a population of 20,780 people.

== Education ==
Kirwan State School is a government primary (Prep–6) school for boys and girls at 21 Burnda Street (19.2993°S 146.7333°E). In 2017, the school had an enrolment of 900 students with 60 teachers (55 full-time equivalent) and 29 non-teaching staff (20 full-time equivalent). It includes a special education program.

The Willows State School is a government primary (Prep–6) school for boys and girls at Bilberry Street (19.3051°S 146.7225°E). In 2017, the school had an enrolment of 1,007 students with 75 teachers (68 full-time equivalent) and 32 non-teaching staff (23 full-time equivalent). It includes a special education program.

Kirwan State High School is a government secondary (7–12) school for boys and girls at Hudson Street (19.3089°S 146.7339°E). In 2017, the school had an enrolment of 1,997 students with 157 teachers (147 full-time equivalent) and 75 non-teaching staff (59 full-time equivalent). It includes a special education program.

Ryan Catholic College is a Catholic primary and secondary (Prep–12) school for boys and girls at 59 Canterbury Road (19.3161°S 146.7188°E). In 2017, the school had an enrolment of 1,886 students with 143 teachers (131 full-time equivalent) and 84 non-teaching staff (69 full-time equivalent).

== Amenities ==
Several leisure facilities are situated within Kirwan itself, including the Willows Golf Club, the Townsville and District Junior Rugby League Grounds and the Townsville Brothers Leagues Club. Kirwan is also well known as the home of the National Rugby League team, the North Queensland Cowboys, and is the site of 1300SMILES Stadium.

The Willows branch of the Queensland Country Women's Association meets at the Girl Guide Hut on the corner of McBride Street and Bamford Lane.
