= Mount Louisa, Queensland =

Mount Louisa Townsville, Queensland
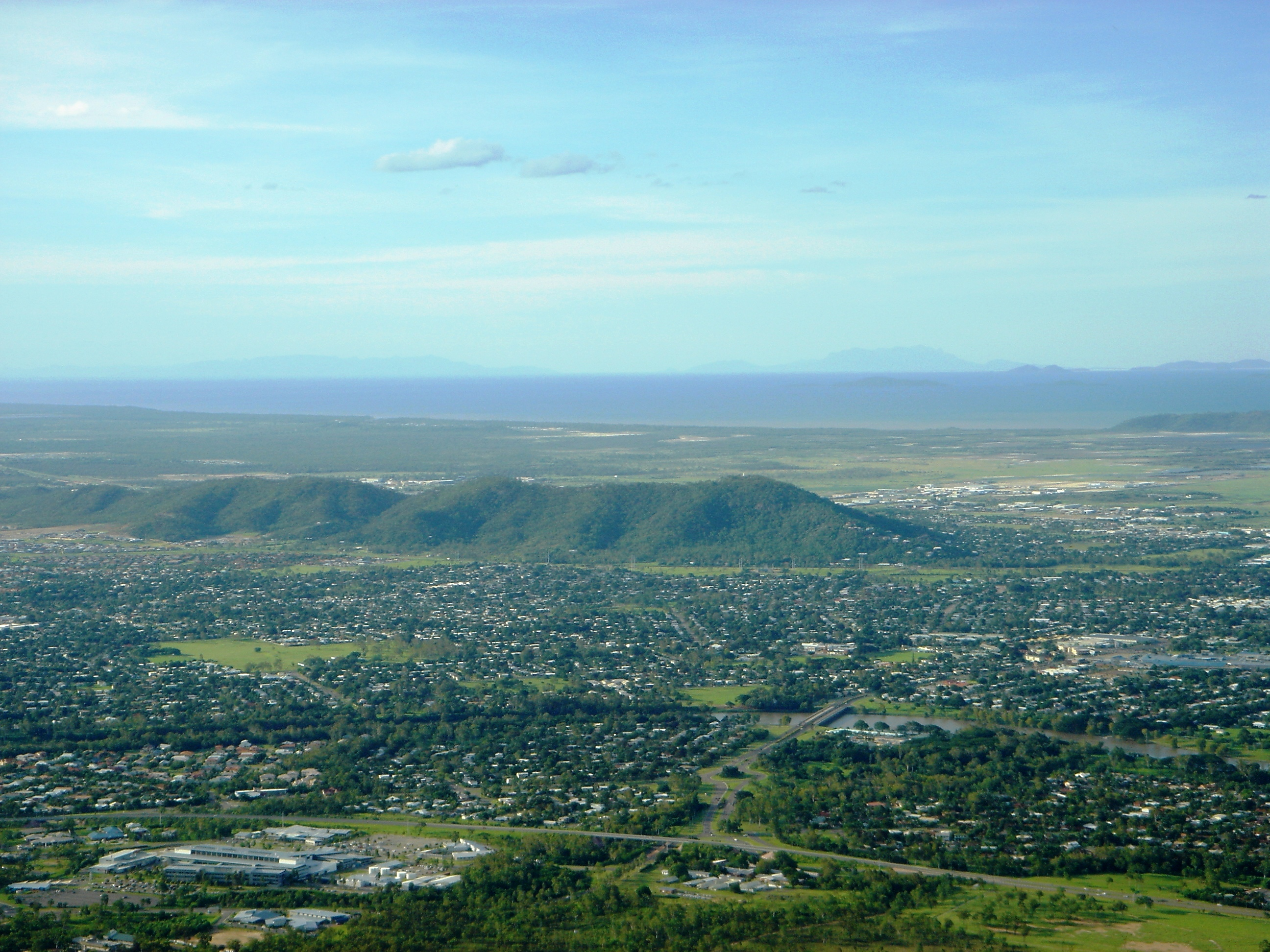
- Mount Louisa, with the Ross River in the foreground and Cleveland Bay in the distance

- Coordinates: 19.2780°S 146.7308°E
- Population: 9,227 (2021 census)
  - Density: 905/km^{2} (2,343/sq mi)
- Postcode(s): 4814
- Area: 10.2 km^{2} (3.9 sq mi)
- Time zone: AEST (UTC+10:00)
- Location: 10.6 km (7 mi) W of Townsville CBD; 1,340 km (833 mi) NNW of Brisbane
- LGA(s): City of Townsville
- State electorate(s): Townsville
- Federal division(s): Herbert
Suburbs around Mount Louisa:
Bohle	Mount St John	Mount St John
Cosgrove	Mount Louisa	Garbutt
Shaw	Kirwan	Heatley

Mount Louisa is a residential suburb in the City of Townsville, Queensland, Australia. The suburb contains the mountain Mount Louisa (19.2789°S 146.7428°E). In the 2021 census, Mount Louisa had a population of 9,227 people.

== Geography ==
The suburb Mount Louisa is located to the west of Townsville CBD. The mountain Mount Louisa itself rises from 10 metres (33 ft) above sea level to the mountain's peak of 193 metres (633 ft) above sea level. The residential areas of the suburb are on the low flat land to the north and south of the mountain. There is a small industrial area along the suburb's northern boundary.

North Townsville Road runs through from west to east, and Garbutt–Upper Ross Road runs along part of the southern boundary.

== History ==
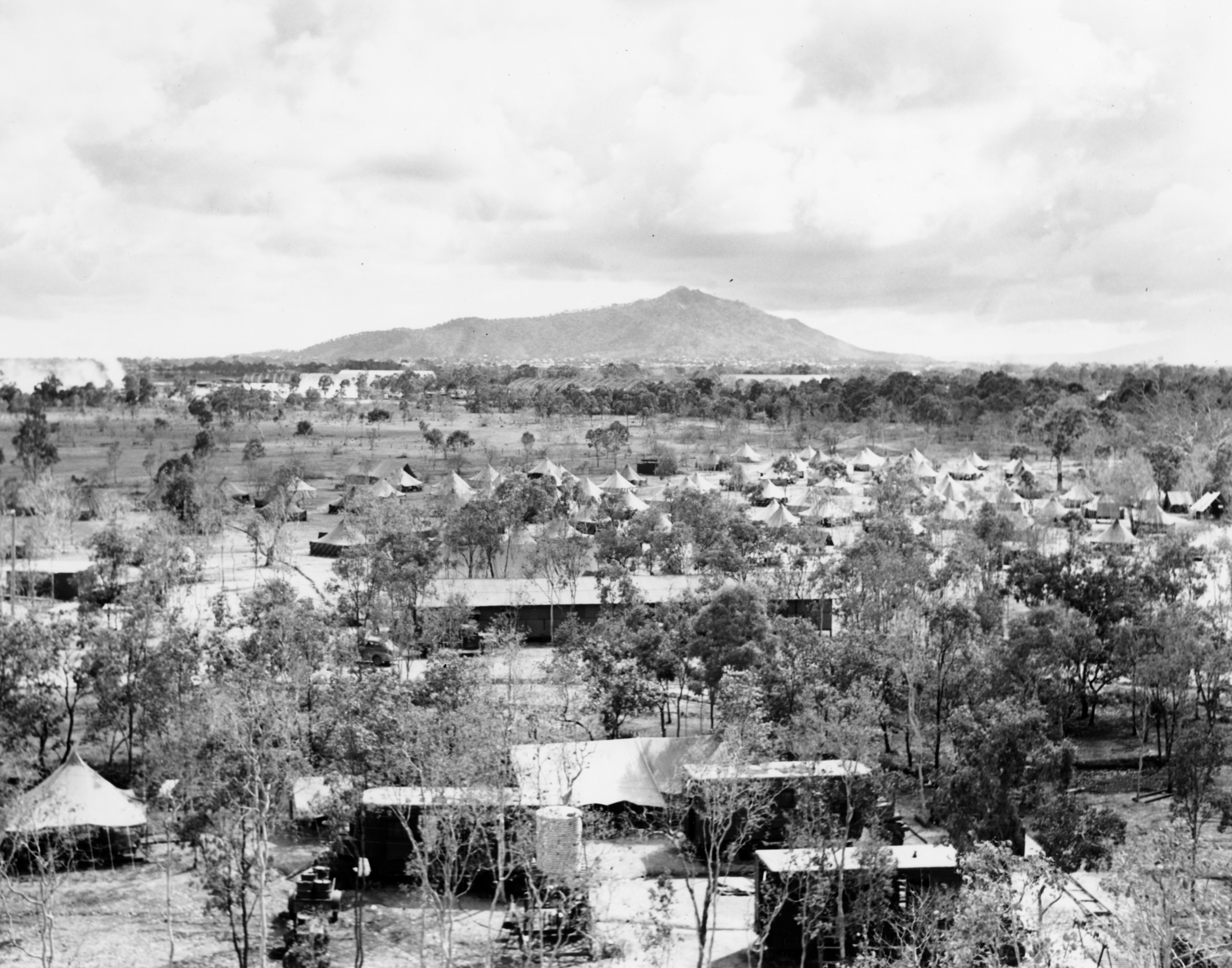
Encampment of Depot #2, Mount Louisa, Townsville during World War 2, 1942

The suburb takes its name from the mountain, which in turn was named by Andrew Ball in April 1864 while exploring Cleveland Bay.

During World War II as many as 4,000 American personnel worked and lived at Depot #2 at the base of Mount Louisa. This Air Depot has often been incorrectly referred to as the 4th Air Depot by many people. There were three main units based at Depot #2. They were the 4th Air Depot Group, the 12th Air Depot Group and the 15th Air Depot Group. Entertainment in the camp was held at Helton Hall, which was an open aired building named after Master Sergeant Helton who was killed in the B-25 crash at Rattlesnake Island. Some famous Hollywood stars appeared at Helton Hall including John Wayne, Joe E. Brown, Gary Cooper, Una Merkel and Phyllis Brook. Woody Herman's orchestra also appeared at Helton Hall.

In 1986 the growth of the congregation at Garbutt Uniting Church necessitated a move a new church called House of Praise at 485 Bayswater Road in Mount Louisa (19.2707°S 146.7471°E). Due to disagreements over the Uniting Church's position on "sexuality", the congregation chose to leave the Uniting Church and now operate as an independent church called Mt Louisa Community Church.

Calvary Christian College opened on 1 February 1978.

== Demographics ==
In the 2016 census, Mount Louisa had a population of 8,825 people.

In the 2021 census, Mount Louisa had a population of 9,227 people.

== Education ==
Calvary Christian College is a private primary and secondary (Prep-12) school for boys and girls at 569 Bayswater Road (19.2703°S 146.7382°E). In 2017, the school had an enrolment of 797 students with 55 teachers (53 full-time equivalent) and 60 non-teaching staff (47 full-time equivalent).

There are no government schools in Mount Louisa. The nearest government primary schools are Heatley State School to the south-east in neighbouring Heatley, Kirwan State School and The Willows State School both to the south in neighbouring Kirwan, and Vincent State School in Vincent. The nearest government secondary schools are Heatley Secondary College in Heatley and Kirwan State High School in Kirwan.
