= RAAF Townsville Aviation Heritage Centre =

The RAAF Townsville Aviation Heritage Centre, TAHC, (formally RAAF Townsville Museum) was first opened in 1983 in a small facility housed within the confines of the Townsville RAAF base. Its original purpose was to provide to the general public a medium for displaying the military aviation heritage of North Queensland through artefacts, photographic displays and memorabilia. Initially, the Museum was under the direction of RAAF Museum Point Cook and was open to the public once a month. The Heritage Centre displays a variety of uniforms, insignia, medical supplies, training materials, weaponry, rations and many models of airplanes. Some unusual artefacts include a pack of study cards schools the student in Survival of Atomic Attack and Silhouette cards teach ship identification from the air. Some unopened medical supplies from the 1940s complete with written instructions are also featured.

It is at 487 Ingham Road (19.2630°S 146.7668°E). Since March 2020, it was temporarily closed due to the COVID-19 pandemic. The centre re-opened after renovations on 14 August 2025, as part of the 80th anniversary celebrations of Victory in the Pacific.

== Opening ==
The Museum was officially opened on 10 June 1983 by the Air Officer Commanding Operational Command Air Vice Marshal Russell Law.

== 1990s ==
The main gate to the RAAF base was closed in 1991, allowing the creation of a new museum facility. In 1992, the Museum's opening hours were expanded to every Sunday, instead of a single day. The major drawcard at the time was a P-51 Mustang that was undergoing restoration.

1992 saw Townsville experience its first fifty-year event after World War II, the 50th Anniversary of the Battle of the Coral Sea. The Museum produced a display of the battle and the areas of the Pacific in which the battle was played out.

In 1995, the 50th Anniversary of Victory in the Pacific (VP50) was a second, larger, event celebrated by Townsville. The volunteer staff of the Museum, lacking direction and support, provided the best displays they could, diligently displaying everything. Unfortunately, negative comments from the public regarding the tiredness of the facilities lead to the temporary closure of the Museum from September 1997 to August 1999. Initially, the closure was to be final, however, through the application of a new curatorial direction, hard work and a variety of new ideas and fresh displays via dedicated volunteer staff, the Museum was granted a reprieve. In 2000, official notification was received that directed the Museum to close on 30 November, though this direction was averted at the last minute and the work of Museum continued.

== 2000s ==
The early part of the 21st century proved to be a period of growth for the Museum. Opening hours were expanded again to Tuesday and Thursday mornings and Sundays. The Museum produced a photographic display on East Timor which was opened by Brigadier Mark Evans, DSC, AM on 18 August. The display offered Townsville residents glimpses of the area of the conflict in which many local residents had been involved.

2001: The Museum received high commendations from the North Queensland Tourism Awards in both 2001 and 2002.

2003: The Museum won the Heritage and Cultural category of the North Queensland Tourism Awards. On 17 December, the Museum celebrated the 100th Anniversary of powered flight by the Wright brothers. Linked to that celebration was the 100th anniversary of Townsville being declared a city.

2005: On 1 January, the Museum became incorporated and the North Queensland Military Aviation Museum Inc, trading as RAAF Townsville Museum was established.

2007: Via funding through the Department of Veteran Affairs, the Museum established a Vietnam display in August. This addition was formally opened by Charles 'Bud' Tingwell, OA. The Museum also opened the Owen 'Wheels' Wheeler Memorial Transport display, a dedicated volunteer for the Museum who dedicated much of his life to military transport. This display consists of a Chevrolet Blitz C30 truck that had been restored with the help of local businesses and volunteers. Extra assistance was given through the Federal Government's 'Work for the Dole' program. Peter Lindsay, the then Parliamentary Secretary to the Minister of Defence, presented an award to the Museum on behalf of the Prime Minister in August.

== Notable outdoor exhibits ==
- A de Havilland Vampire T.35 jet (A79-656), which is on static display.
- A Matra R530 Guided Missile System
- A Bofors antiaircraft gun
- A cross sectional display of a Bell UH-1 Iroquois (A2-382) used by Australian forces in Vietnam. This particular aircraft ditched at Long Hai Beach in June 1970 after being hit by small arms fire. The wreck was recovered and was written off then cut in two. The other half is at the Point Cook Museum.
- A variety of WW2 era engines and propellers collected from aircraft that visited Townsville during that period.

== Opening Hours ==
As at September 2025, the centre is open from 9am to 12 noon every Tuesday and Thursday, and from 9am to 3pm each Sunday. Admission is free to the public.
