= Rowes Bay, Queensland =

Rowes Bay
- Suburb
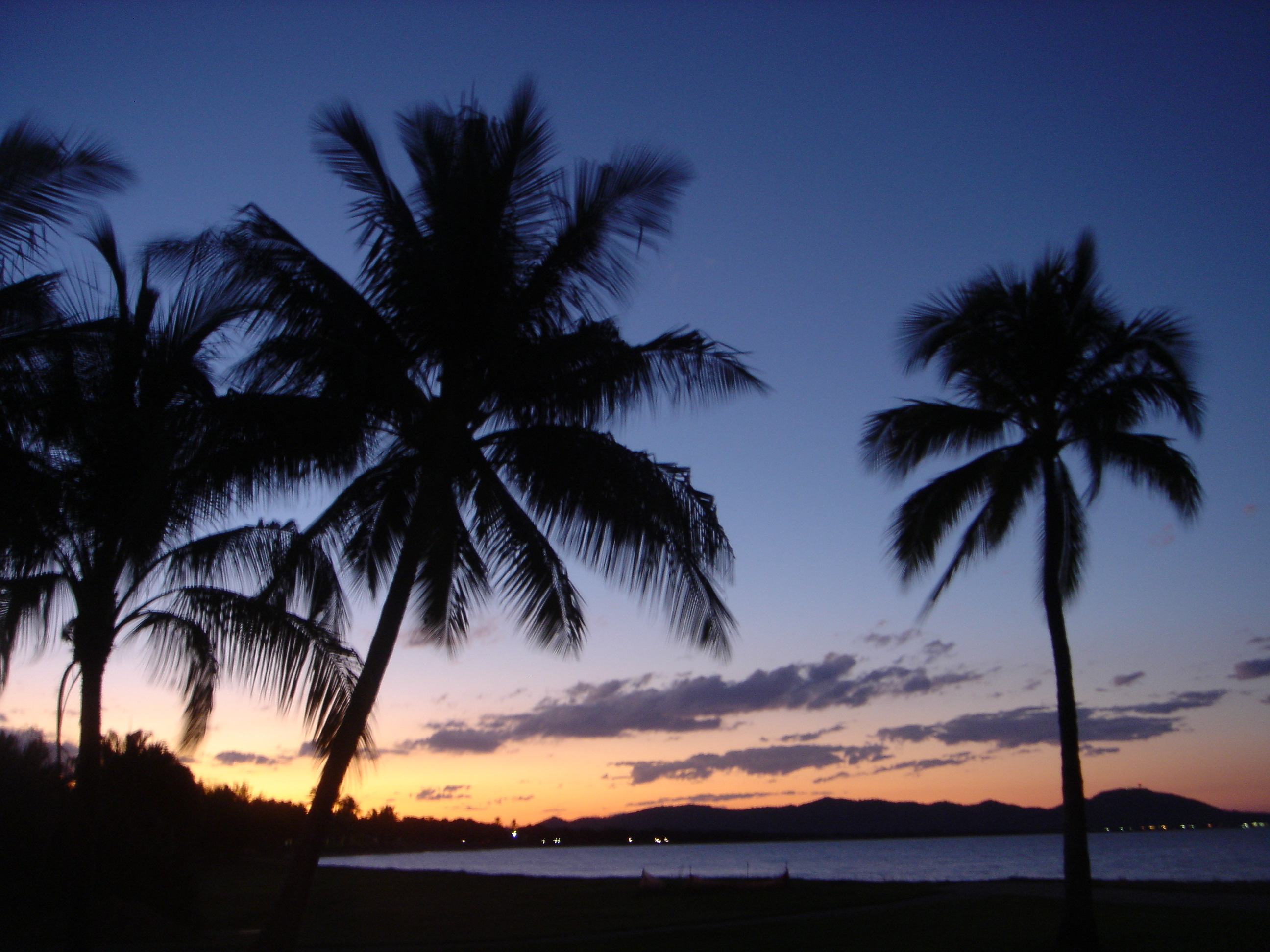
- Dusk at Soroptimist Park, Rowes Bay; looking northwards to Cape Pallarenda Conservation Park

- Interactive map of Rowes Bay
- Coordinates: 19.2425°S 146.7769°E
- Country: Australia
- State: Queensland
- City: Townsville
- LGA: City of Townsville
- Location: 4.3 km (2.7 mi) NW of Townsville CBD; 1,460 km (910 mi) NNW of Brisbane

Government
  - State electorate: Townsville
  - Federal division: Herbert

Area
  - Total: 2.8 km^{2} (1.1 sq mi)

Population
  - Total: 541 (2021 census)
  - Density: 193/km^{2} (500/sq mi)
- Time zone: UTC+10:00 (AEST)
- Postcode: 4810
Suburbs around Rowes Bay
Town Common	Coral Sea	Coral Sea
Garbutt	Rowes Bay	Coral Sea
Garbutt	Garbutt	Belgian Gardens

Rowes Bay is a suburb of Townsville in the City of Townsville, Queensland, Australia. In the 2021 census, Rowes Bay had a population of 541 people.

== Geography ==
Rowes Bay is located in a low-lying area adjacent to the Cleveland Bay beach. Its borders are determined by the Coral Sea, Townsville Airport and Mundy Creek, and only a small portion of the suburb's area is taken up by housing. Neighbouring suburbs include Garbutt, West End and Belgian Gardens; however, Rowes Bay is relatively isolated from other suburbs due to its location surrounded by the Town Common.

The Townsville Cemetery (also known as Belgian Gardens Cemetery) and a retirement village are located within the suburb.

== History ==
Rowes Bay was named after Charles Seville Rowe, one of the first settlers at Cleveland Bay. Only after World War II did the name Rowes come into general use; prior to this the area was recorded as Rose Bay and Ross Bay.

During World War II, Jimmys Lookout had an anti-aircraft gun and search light battery. Its purpose was to protect Townsville and in particular the military airport from Japanese airborne attacks.

The Queensland Police Service Academy (North Queensland campus) commenced training in October 1996.

== Demographics ==
In the 2011 census, Rowes Bay had a population of 539 people.

In the 2016 census, Rowes Bay had a population of 573 people.

In the 2021 census, Rowes Bay had a population of 541 people.

== Education ==
Cleveland Education and Training Centre is a primary and secondary (5-12) special-purpose school for boys and girls in the Cleveland Youth Detention Centre on Old Common Road (19.2496°S 146.7843°E). In 2018, the school had an enrolment of 66 students with 24 teachers (21 full-time equivalent) and 17 non-teaching staff (13 full-time equivalent).

There are no mainstream schools in Rowes Bay. The nearest government primary school is Belgian Gardens State School in neighbouring Belgian Gardens to the south-east. The nearest government secondary school is Townsville State High School in Railway Estate to the south-east.

== Facilities ==
Cleveland Youth Detention Centre is for young people aged between 10 and 17 years who have been sentenced to detention or are being held on remand by the courts. It is on Old Comons Road (19.2488°S 146.7848°E).

Despite the name, Belgian Gardens Cemetery is within Rowes Bay at 62 Evans Street, but access to the cemetery is via the suburb of Belgian Gardens (19.2435°S 146.7827°E). It is managed by the Townsville City Council.

The Townsville War Cemetery is within the Belgian Gardens cemetery (19.2460°S 146.7879°E). It has 222 burials from World War II. The Office of Australian War Graves is within the cemetery (19.2458°S 146.7880°E). The war cemetery is managed by the Commonwealth War Graves Commission.

== Amenities ==
Rowes Bay Retirement Community is a retirement village at Havana Street off Cape Pallandera Road (19.2355°S 146.7854°E).

There are a number of parks in the suburb, including:

- Hooper Street Park (19.2484°S 146.7883°E)
- Rowes Bay Park (19.2407°S 146.7899°E)

== Attractions ==
Rowes Bay is dominated by a scenic 10 kilometres (6.2 mi) Cleveland Bay beach, which has sweeping views of Magnetic Island. The beach is punctuated at intervals by tidal creeks. A short drive up Cape Pallarenda Road is located the suburb of Pallarenda which is equipped with a beachfront park and boat ramp. Cycling or jogging alone the sealed foreshore pathway is a popular pastime but swimming is not encouraged due to a risk of crocodile or jellyfish attack.

At the southern end of the beach area is Soroptimist Park, which has lawns, barbecue facilities and an adventure playground designed specifically to be suitable for all children including those with disabilities. The park includes several attractive pieces of public art, contributed in 1988 and 1994. The northern end of the beach is a popular site for kitesurfing.

Jimmys Lookout is off Old Commons Road on the western edge of the Belgian Gardens Cemetery (19.2436°S 146.7819°E).

== Gallery ==
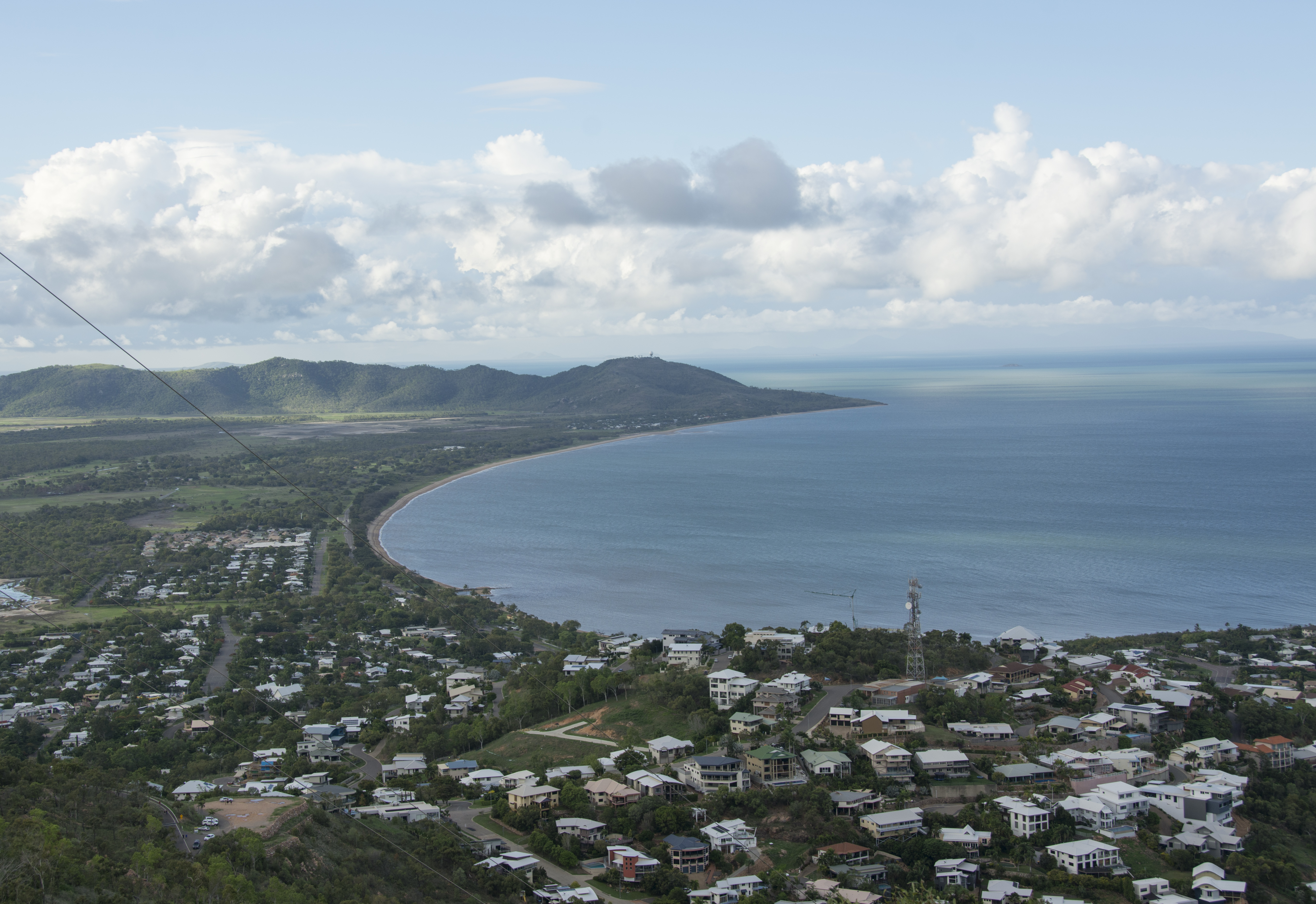
View from Castle Hill towards Pallarenda, showing the Rowes Bay caravan park.

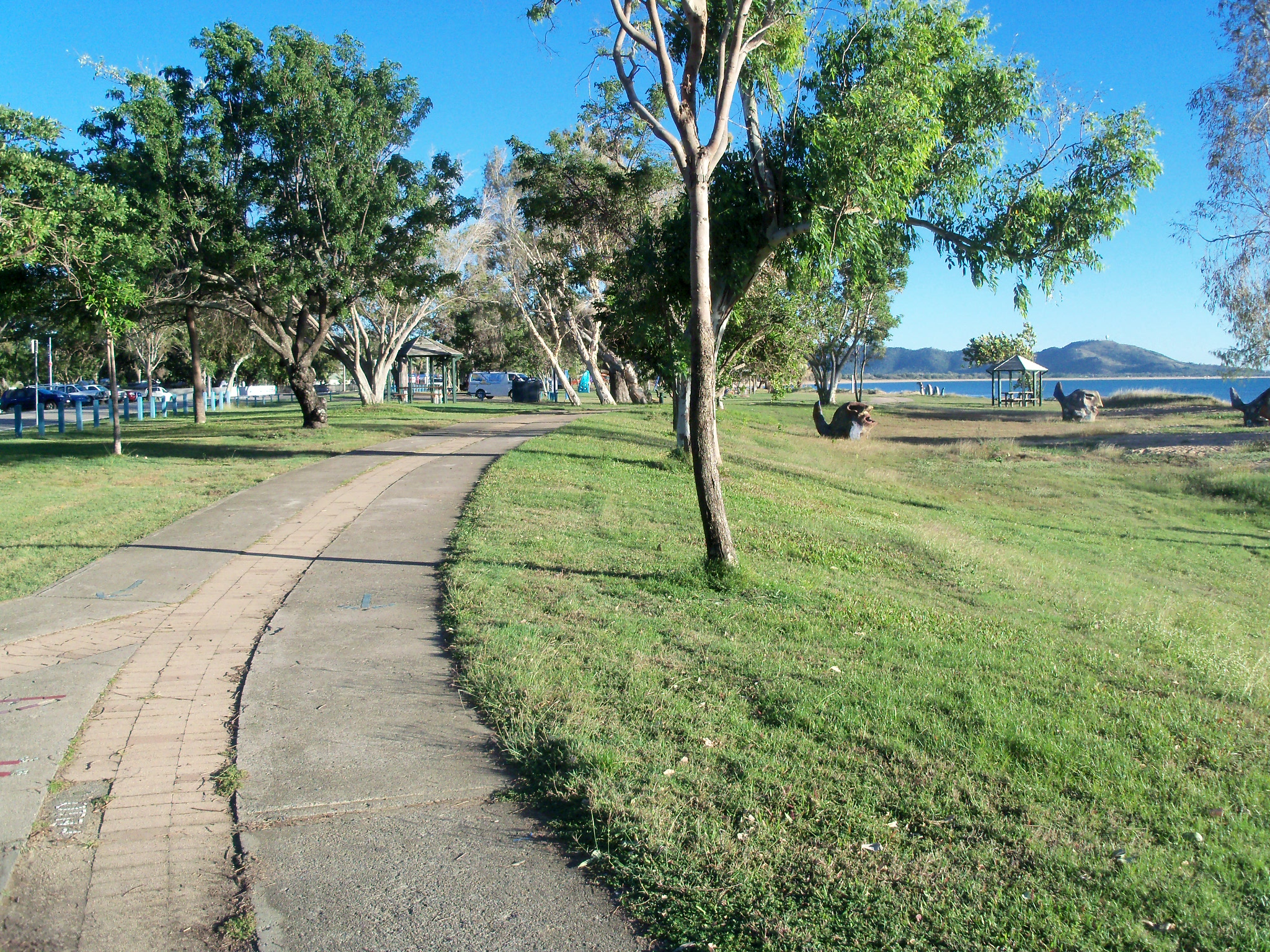
Walking path and bikeway towards Pallarenda.

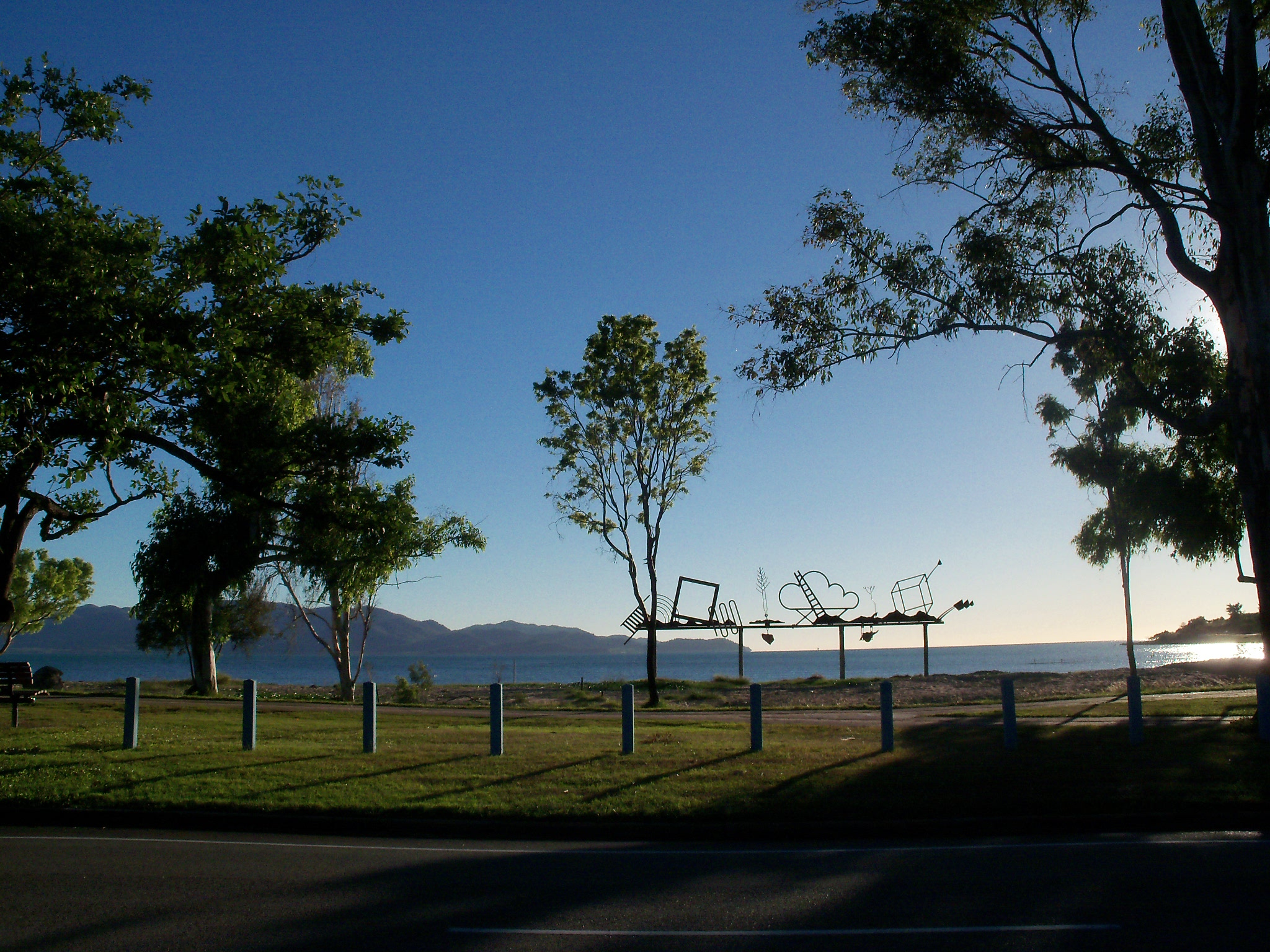
Looking towards Magnetic Island.

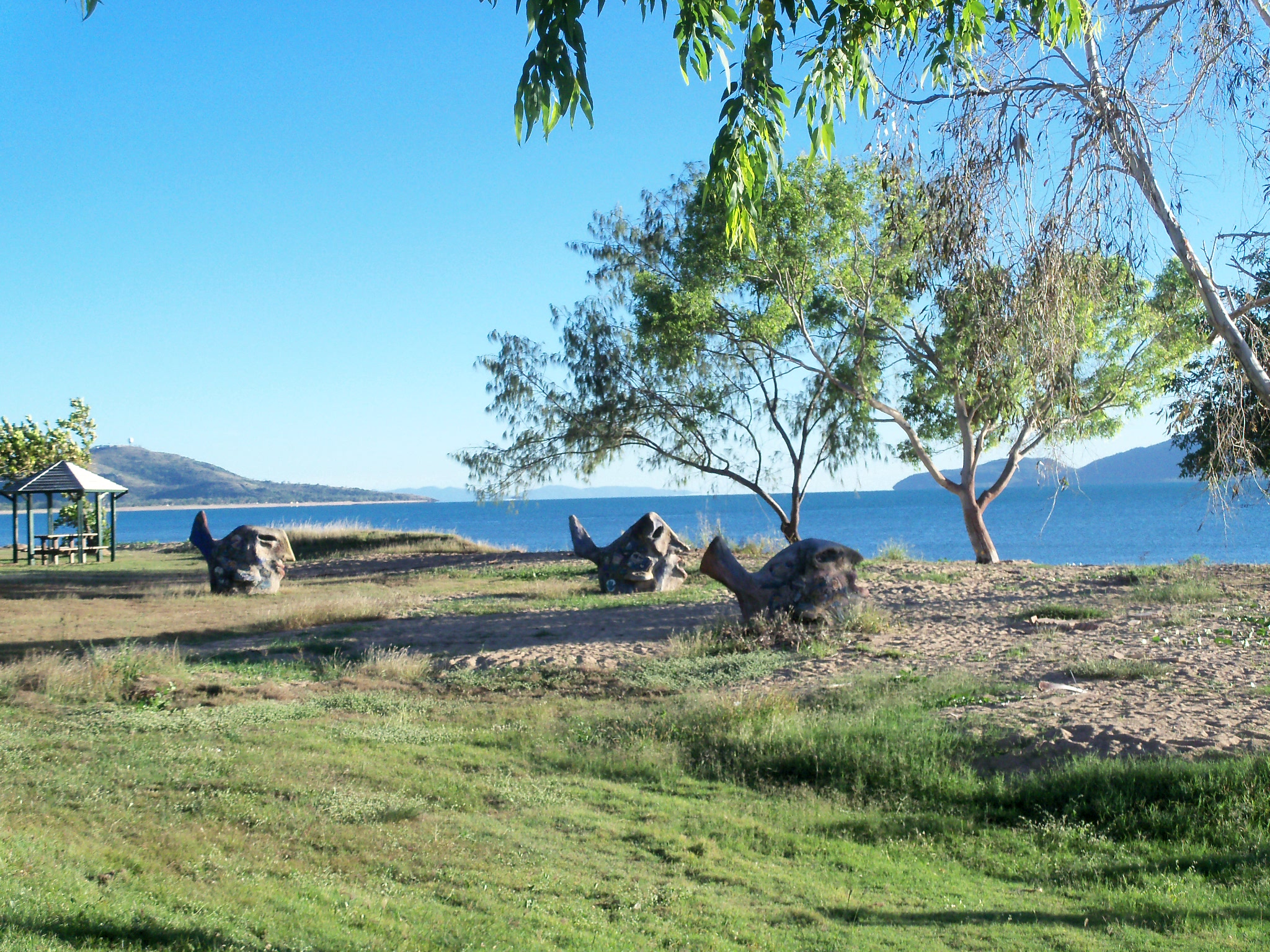
Looking towards Pallarenda.

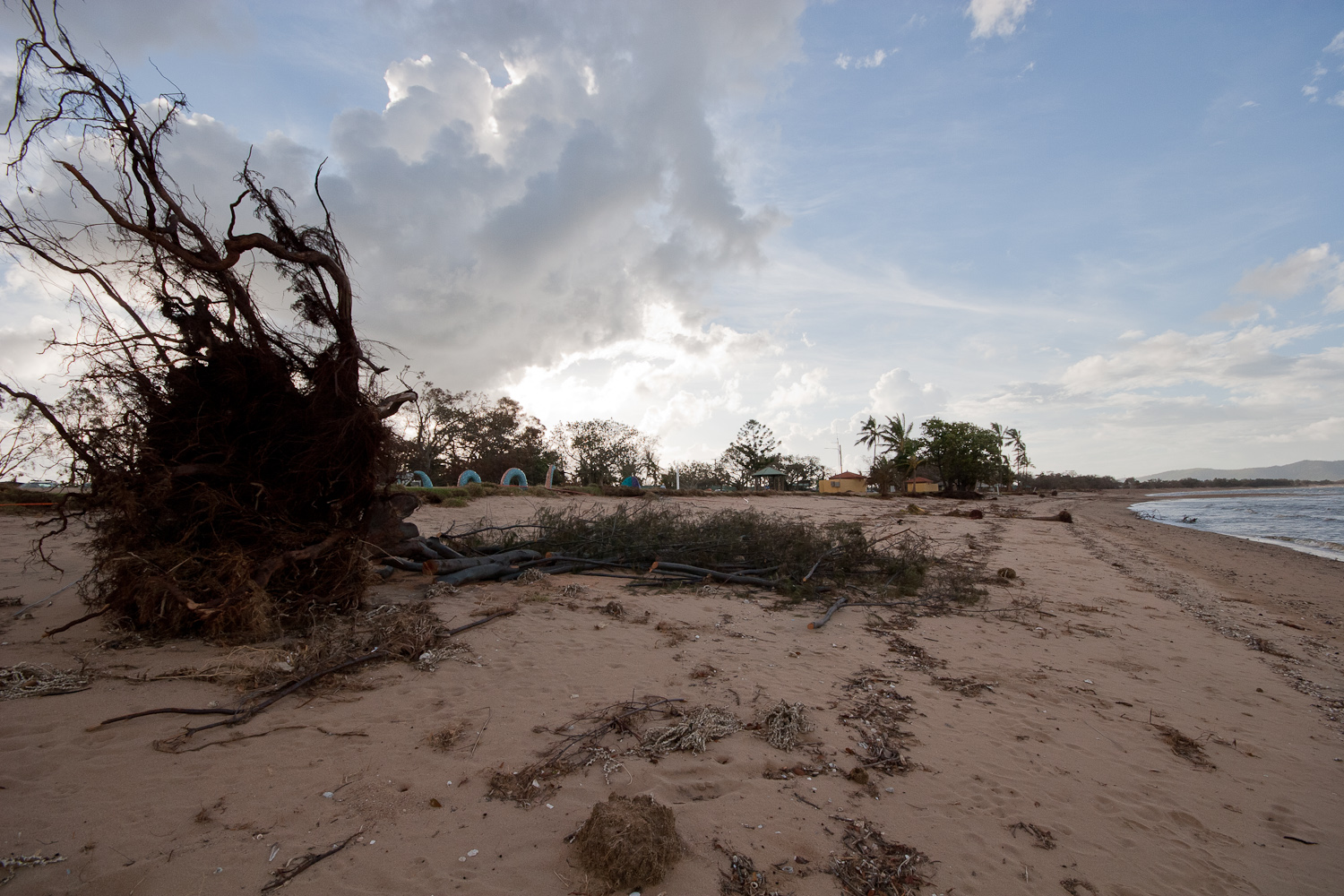
Post-cyclone beach near Heatleys Parade, on dusk. Looking towards Pallarenda.

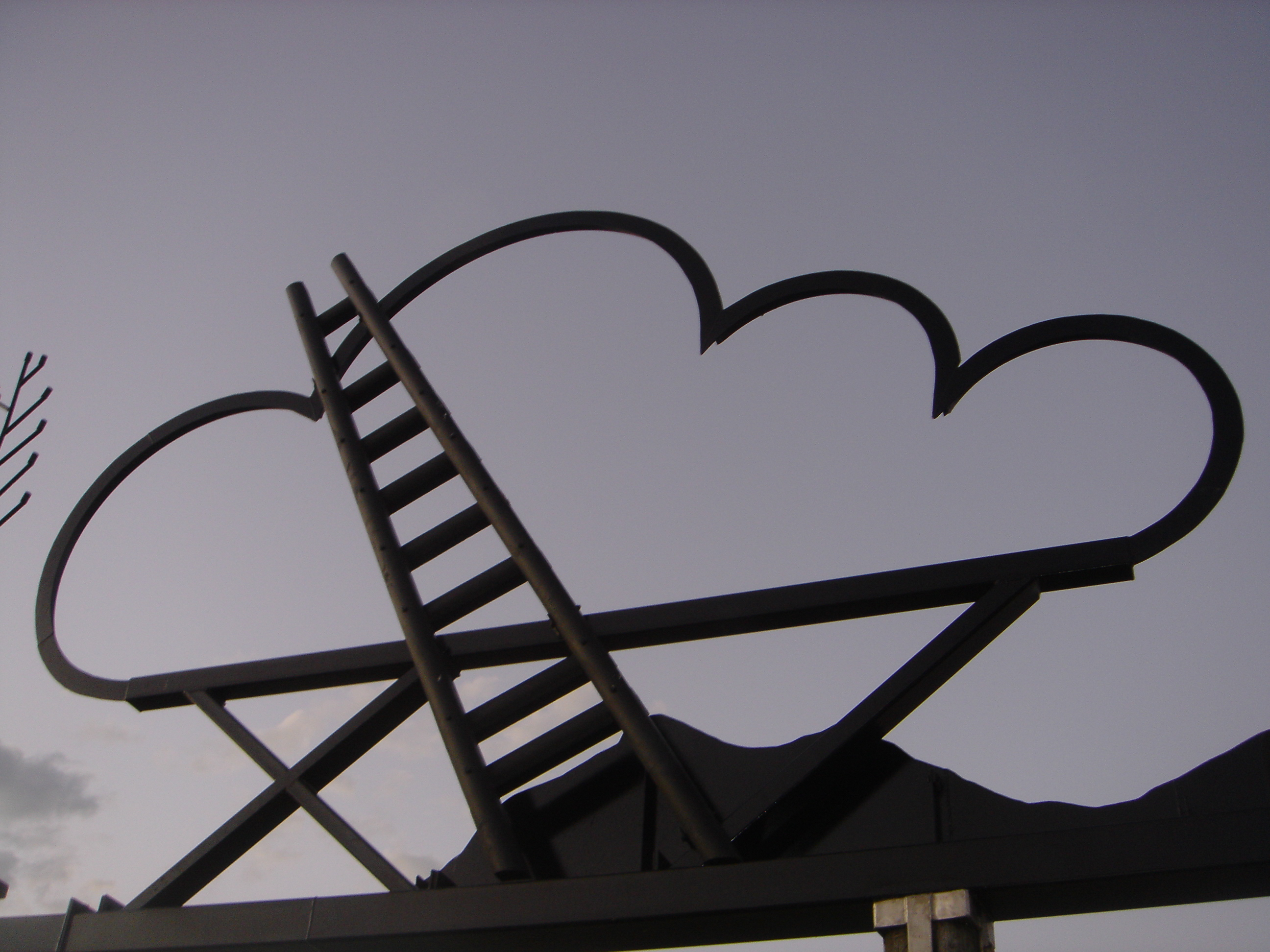
Detail of public art sculpture, Soroptimist Park, Townsville.

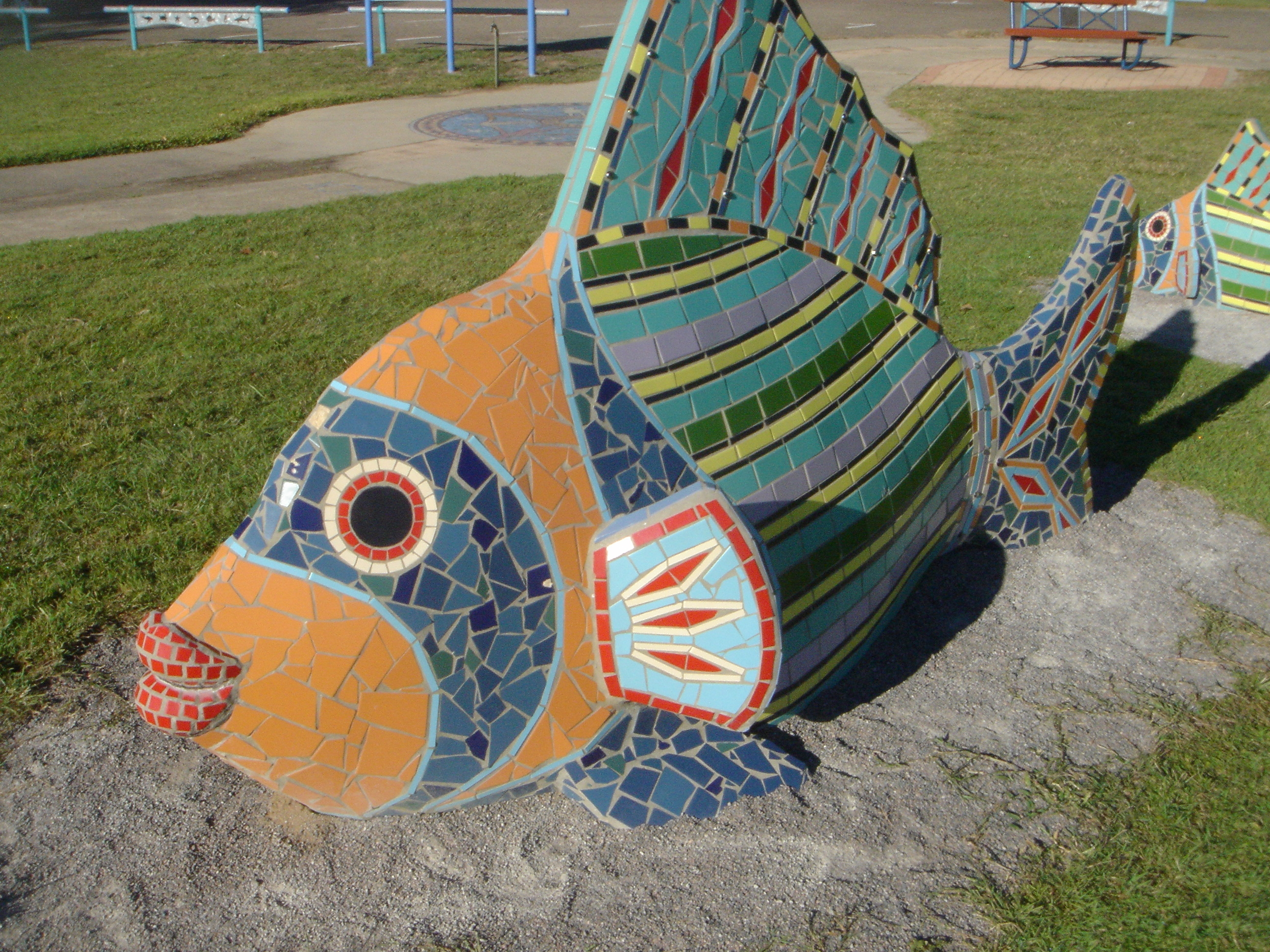
Public art sculpture, Soroptimist Park, Townsville.

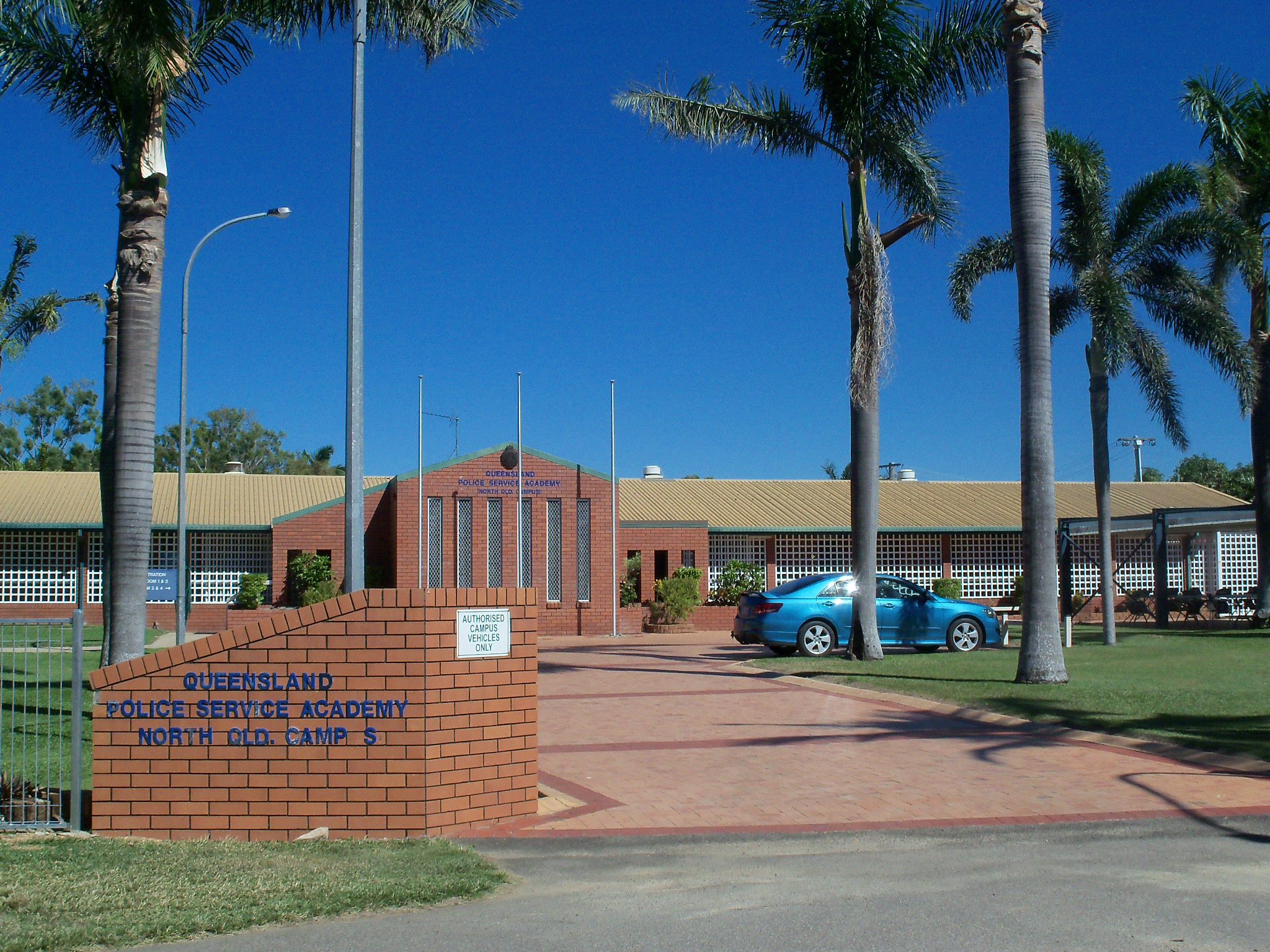
Queensland Police Service Academy (North Queensland campus).

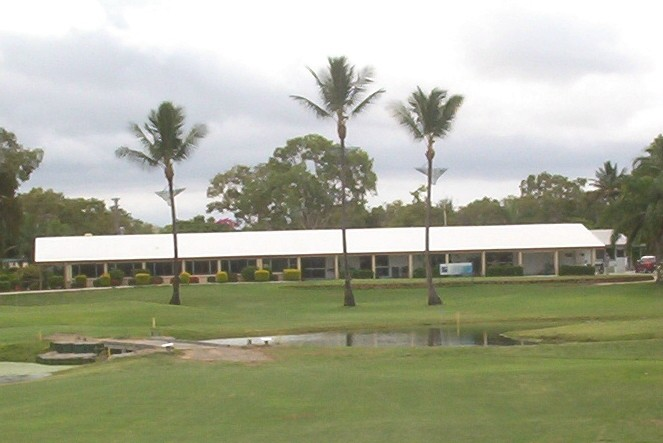
Rowes Bay Golf Club clubhouse, near the Town Common.

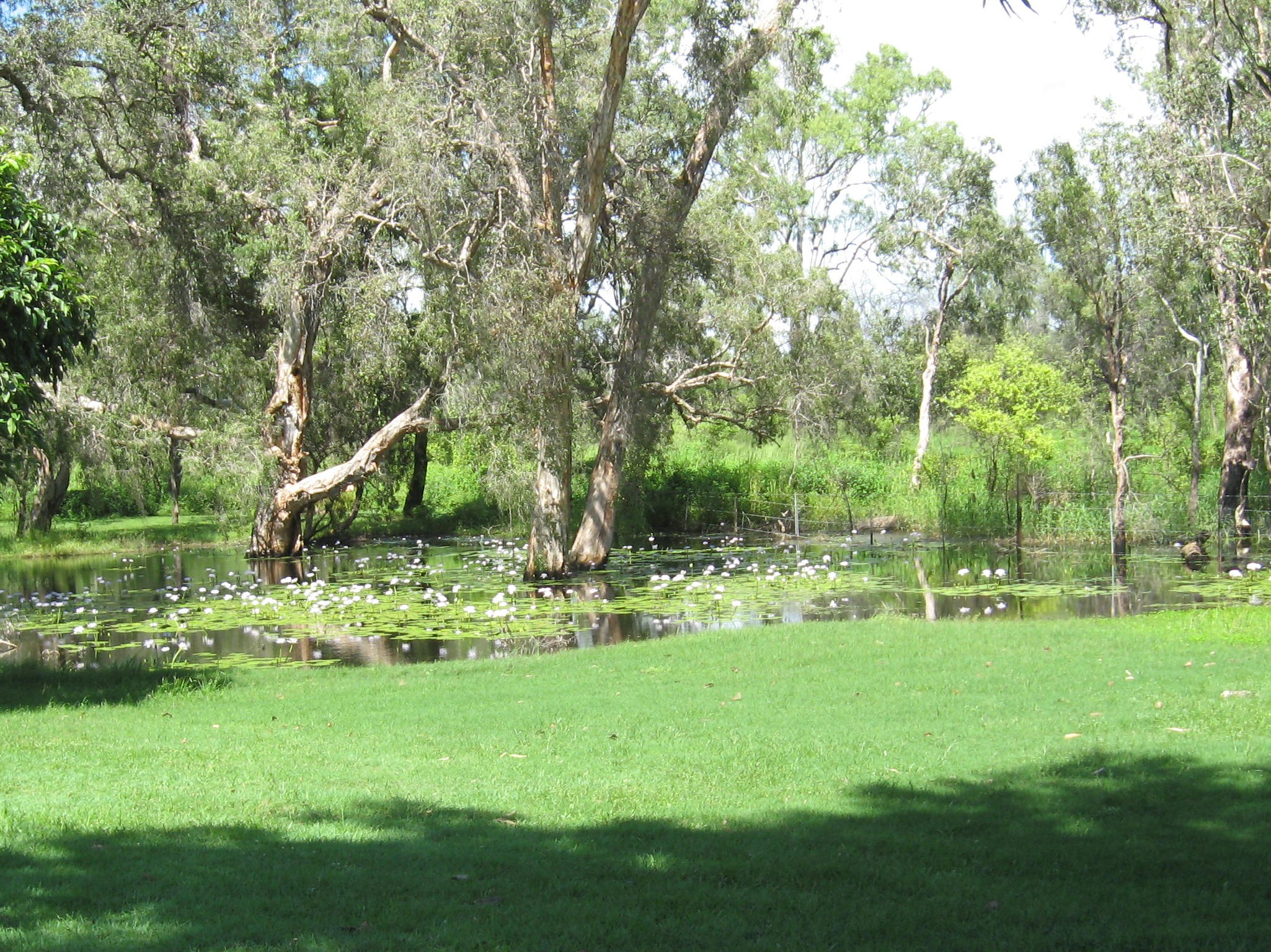
Rowes Bay Golf Club wetlands near the 11th hole.
