= Heatley, Queensland =

Heatley Townsville, Queensland
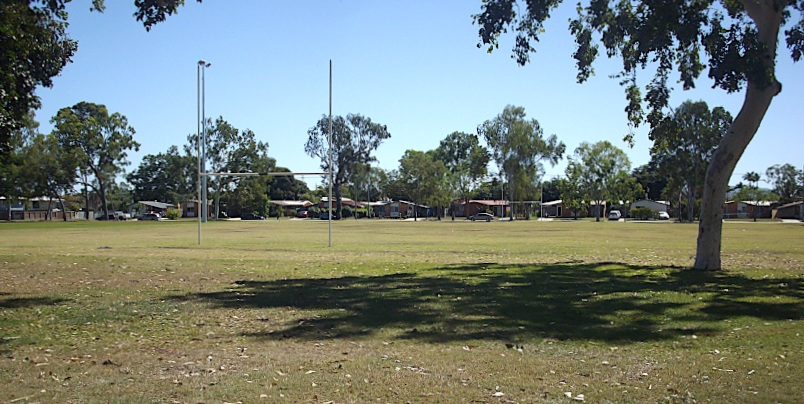
- Heatley Park

- Coordinates: 19.2933°S 146.7527°E
- Population: 3,907 (2021 census)
  - Density: 1,950/km^{2} (5,060/sq mi)
- Postcode(s): 4814
- Area: 2.0 km^{2} (0.8 sq mi)
- Time zone: AEST (UTC+10:00)
- Location: 9.1 km (6 mi) SW of Townsville CBD; 1,339 km (832 mi) NNW of Brisbane
- LGA(s): City of Townsville
- State electorate(s): Thuringowa
- Federal division(s): Herbert
Suburbs around Heatley:
Mount Louisa	Garbutt	Vincent
Kirwan	Heatley	Aitkenvale
Kirwan	Cranbrook	Cranbrook

Heatley is a suburb in the City of Townsville, Queensland, Australia. In the 2021 census, Heatley had a population of 3,907 people.

== Geography ==
The land is relatively flat at 0–10 metres (0–33 ft) above sea level. The land use is predominantly residential.

Douglas–Garbutt Road (Nathan Street) runs along near the northern boundary, and Garbutt–Upper Ross Road (Dalrymple Road) runs along the eastern boundary.

== History ==
Heatley is situated in the traditional Wulgurukaba Aboriginal country. The origin of the suburb name is from W.J. Heatley, the former Mayor of Townsville from 1927 to 1933.

Heatley State High School opened on 30 January 1968. On 16 December 1999, it renamed Heatley Secondary College.

Heatley State School opened on 25 January 1971.

Townsville-Thuringowa Centre for Continuing Secondary Education opened on 29 January 1990 as an adult campus of Heatley Secondary College.

== Demographics ==
In the 2016 census, Heatley had a population of 4,038 people.

In the 2021 census, Heatley had a population of 3,907 people.

== Education ==
Heatley State School is a government primary (Early Childhood to Year 6) school for boys and girls at 410 Fulham Road (19.2938°S 146.7491°E). In 2018, the school had an enrolment of 536 students with 51 teachers (45 full-time equivalent) and 34 non-teaching staff (21 full-time equivalent). It includes a special education program.

Heatley Secondary College is a government secondary (7–12) school for boys and girls on the corner of Hanlon Street and Fulham Road (19.2866°S 146.7552°E). In 2018, the school had an enrolment of 768 students with 66 teachers (64 full-time equivalent) and 41 non-teaching staff (32 full-time equivalent). It includes a special education program. It includes the Townsville–Thuringowa Centre for Continuing Secondary Education is a secondary (7–12) Centre for Continuing Secondary Education for adult students.

== Amenities ==
The Anglican Church of the Ascension is at 6 Mill Drive (19.2886°S 146.7589°E).

Heatley Park is a park in Fulham Road (19.2883°S 146.7561°E). It includes the Heatley Park Community Centre, the Long Tan Memorial Pool, the Western Suburbs Tennis Club and children's play equipment.
