= Kissing Point Fortification =

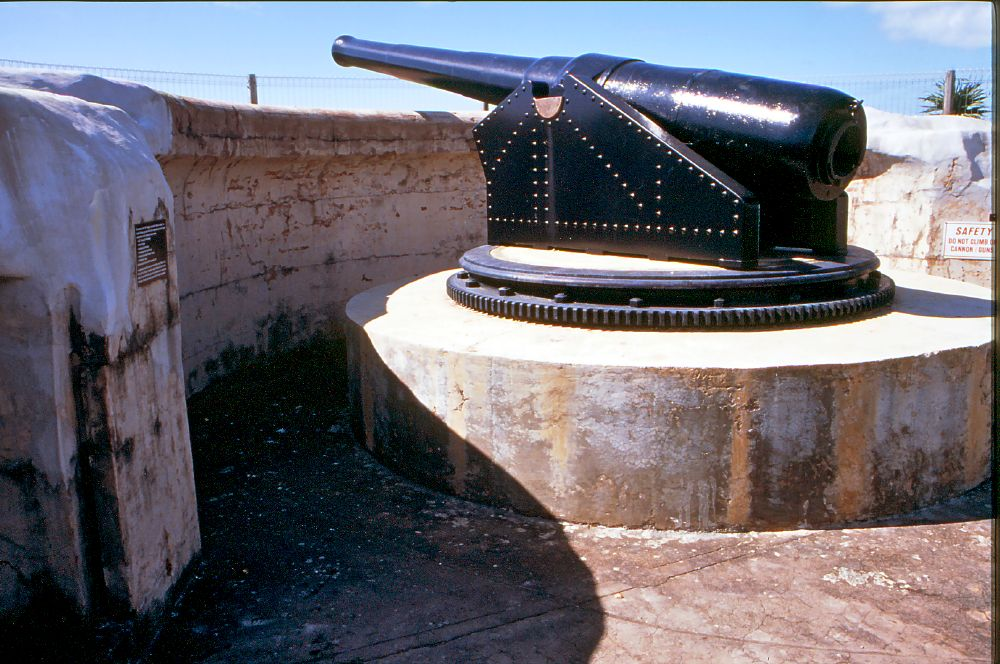
- Kissing Point Fortification, 2007

- Location within Queensland Location within Australia
- 19.2399°S 146.8043°E
- Location: 38–40 Howitt Street, North Ward, City of Townsville, Queensland, Australia

History
- Design period: 1870s–1890s (late 19th century)
- Built: 1891 & 1939–1941

Site notes
- Architect(s): Peter Scratchley, Edward Druitt

Queensland Heritage Register
- Official name: Kissing Point Fortification & Jezzine Barracks (part)
- Type: state heritage (built)
- Designated: 5 February 2010
- Reference no.: 601129
- Significant period: 1880s–2007
- Significant components: wall/s – retaining, vista/s, parade ground/quadrangle/assembly ground, mounting block/stand, views from, machine gun mounting, magazine / explosives store, guns/weaponry/armament, lookout/observation platform, tunnel – military, casemate/s, drill ground/parade ground, gun emplacement, views to, objects (movable) – defence, ventilation shaft – military, store/s / storeroom / storehouse
- Builders: A McMillan (Govt Foreman of Works c1890)

Kissing Point Fortification is a heritage-listed fortification at 38–40 Howitt Street, North Ward, City of Townsville, Queensland, Australia. It was designed by Peter Scratchley and Major Edward Druitt and built from 1891 by A McMillan (Govt Foreman of Works c1890) and then from 1939 to 1941. It is also known as Jezzine Barracks. It was added to the Queensland Heritage Register on 5 February 2010.

It is now the home of the Army Museum of North Queensland.

== History ==
The fortification at Kissing Point occupies part of a rocky headland separating Cleveland Bay and Rowes Bay at the northern end of The Strand in Townsville; while the Jezzine Barracks complex extends approximately ten hectares to its south-west. The former was built in 1891 as a two-gun battery and part of the coastal defence scheme being established to protect the colony of Queensland and its ports from naval bombardment, installations of which started at Fort Lytton (1880–1882) in Brisbane and extended to Green Hill Fort on Thursday Island (1891–92). Both during and after the war the adjacent barracks complex grew up over the large site where the battery's garrison buildings were located and where regular training and annual encampments of northern military forces had been conducted since 1889, most particularly those of the Kennedy Regiment formed in Townsville in 1886. The entire former military site, encompassing the barracks and the fortification, is delimited by Cook, Isley, Mitchell and Howitt Streets to the west and south, and enclosed by a semi-circle of sea cliffs and littoral land to the north and east; however the heritage boundary encompasses only those parts of Queensland heritage significance, namely the fortification structures and earthworks, five P1 huts put in place during World War II, and the parade ground at the site's formal entrance. The military presence on this headland has persisted over a period of just more than 125 years to 2007 when it was officially closed as an active army site; although the 31st Royal Queensland Regiment precinct, established as the Army Museum of North Queensland, and Jezzine House, are still owned by the Australian Government. The remainder of the site has been gifted to the Townsville City Council as Trustees.

Prior to the 1860s, defence of the Australian colonies had been solely the responsibility of the British government, Britain considering that its navy would provide the first line of defence in any threat to her colonial empire. An investigation into colonial military expenditure in 1862 resulted in Britain demanding that the Australian colonies, by then self-governing, contribute toward the costs of maintaining Imperial garrisons on colonial soil, and encouraged them to provide for their own military infrastructure. Queensland, which had separated from New South Wales in December 1859, could not afford to contribute to this scheme immediately so Imperial troops were gradually withdrawn, the last leaving in 1870.

By the 1870s the Australian colonies were developing rapidly and concerns were renewed about potential threats from colonial powers such as Russia and France - the latter having annexed New Caledonia in 1873 – as well as about American privateers seeking gold. A series of incidents involving Russia and Britain added to the fears aroused during the Crimean War of 1853–1856. One such "scare" in 1876 motivated the colonial governments of New South Wales, Queensland, Victoria and South Australia to jointly invite British Royal Engineers Colonel Sir William Francis Drummond Jervois and Lieutenant-Colonel Peter Scratchley, to inspect existing defence installations and make recommendations as to how they might be improved. Jervois had been Inspector General of Fortifications and Secretary to the United Kingdom Defence Committee and had superintended the construction of its defences during the 1860s. Scratchley's particular expertise was in the design and construction of deterrent coastal fortresses and he would have a profound influence on colonial Australian defence matters; his advice causing a number of fortified installations to be constructed along the coastline of Australia, including Fort Lytton at the mouth of the Brisbane River (1880–81), Fort Scratchley in Newcastle (1882), Bare Island Fort on Botany Bay (1885), Fort Queenscliff and the system of defences for Port Phillip Bay in Victoria (1860–1891), and Fort Glanville in South Australia (1882).

Jervois and Scratchley arrived in Queensland in early August 1877 and had presented their report to the government by the end of the month. In it they identified the most likely threats to the new colony to be maritime bombardment, raids or extortion. They recommended that the mainland colonies develop their sea power in concert with a series of coastal defences. These defences were the standard means of defending ports and harbours following Britain's rise as a naval power, relieving the navy of its defensive functions and affording it greater scope for offensive attacks. Despite being physically closer to the source of most threats, Queensland, with its sparse population and limited resources, was not considered to be greatly at risk and Townsville of little strategic importance. The report did recommend that Brisbane, as the capital and principal port of Queensland, be defended with the construction of a fort at Lytton.

Cleveland Bay and its nascent settlement were first declared a port of entry in September 1865, having been privately surveyed the previous year by agents of John Melton Black - the general manager of Robert Towns & Co, one of the largest pastoral interests in the Kennedy District. Towns entered a partnership with Black to provide financial assistance for this venture and early in 1866 the new municipality was named Townsville in honour of his contribution, although he visited only once. Forming the north-western limit of the township, the rocky headland of Kissing Point had been given its name by 1864. In the five years following the establishment of Townsville a series of nearby gold discoveries were made, most notably those at Ravenswood and Charters Towers; the latter becoming the richest goldfield in North Queensland. The Great Northern railway built in the early 1880s to service these fields - a network that spread out to connect other inland centres to the busy port - was to fuel Townsville's growth in size and importance, allowing it to evolve into the northern centre of not only the mining industry but also those of pastoralism and sugar.

Following completion of the 1877 assessment, Scratchley was retained as a consultant by several colonial governments including Queensland. Another war "scare" erupted in 1878 when Russian forces advanced on the capital of Turkey, a British ally, and again galvanised colonial governments in Australia regarding their strategic forward defence. No. 4 Battery, a small detachment of 40 men from the Queensland Volunteer Artillery Brigade was formed in Townsville in June. It was not until January 1881 that Lieutenant-Colonel George Glendower Blaxland, the Commandant of the Queensland defence forces, was able to make his first inspection of this group. He also selected the site for a battery at Kissing Point. As the year progressed a number of Volunteer Independent Rifle Companies were raised at Charters Towers, Townsville and Ravenswood. Scratchley continued to provide progress reports to the Queensland Government, submitting his final memorandum in 1882, which was the first to recommend specific measures for the protection of Townsville, which he had visited. These entailed mounting two available 64-pounder rifled guns on travelling carriages in positions so as to fire seaward, building a small associated magazine and enclosing a site to be selected. It was suggested that a sandbag battery could be constructed upon the outbreak of war.

The defence systems in Queensland were deemed to be lacking in cohesion and discipline, and a necessary reorganisation was soon established under the Queensland Defence Act 1884. It created a small permanent force as well as a partially paid militia force and voluntary infantry units, and set out new orders of battle and establishment. It also divided the colony into two Military Districts - Southern and Northern. On 24 February 1885 No 4 Battery was redesignated as the Townsville Garrison Battery in the Kennedy Division (KD) of the Northern Military Division (NMD). A number of volunteer companies, A through F, were formed in Townsville, Charters Towers and Ravenswood throughout the year. By June, when Queensland Premier Sir Samuel Walker Griffith toured the north and visited Townsville, the 64-pounder guns recommended by Scratchley in 1882 had been mounted at Kissing Point and Magazine Island and were fired. This entailed construction of a timber platform over which the gun carriage could move. The 10-acre (4.0 ha) site where the battery was constructed was formally gazetted for Defence Purposes in 1886. Following reorganisation of the colony's regimental divisions, in October of the same year, the 3rd Queensland (Kennedy) Regiment was raised and headquartered in Townsville, subsuming the various Volunteer Independent Rifle Companies listed above. It received its colours in 1887 when its headquarters were shifted to Charters Towers.

The first annual encampment for the north Queensland component of the colony's Defence Force had taken place at Townsville in 1885 at Cluden Park, on the south-eastern outskirts of the settlement. In 1887 drill practice was being conducted at Kissing Point and Magazine Island. As more volunteer units formed these encampments grew larger, necessitating their removal to a larger open space. In 1889 they were moved to the newly gazetted public recreation reserve of 25-acre (10 ha) known as Norman Park, adjacent to the west of the Kissing Point reserve and leased to the Queensland and later the Australian governments by the Townsville Town Council. Regular encampments were held at Norman Park until the start of World War II. In preparation for these events the salt pan land adjacent to the south of the Kissing Point outcrop and subject to intermittent tidal flooding was drained with a dam and sluice valve. Similar earthwork, including a dam across a creek that flowed into Rowes Bay, was carried out to make the salt pan and mangrove areas along the western half of Norman Park into a suitable training and parade field. It was not until 1909 that the Deed of Grant for Norman Park was purchased for Defence Purposes by the Australian Government.

By the late 1880s attitudes towards colonial defence were changing, as was technology both for weaponry and shipping. Techniques for defence against maritime attack were under constant review. Despite the ongoing debate the colonial government finally agreed to commit to building defences at Kissing Point and Magazine Island that would operate in concert to protect all approaches to the busy harbour.

Major Edward Druitt, who trained at the Royal Engineers submarine miners depot at Gosport near Portsmouth in England, was appointed to design and supervise the works at Townsville, arriving there in early 1890 and soon after preparing a plan for the Kissing Point battery. The fortifications comprised an embanked parapet facing seaward; two gun emplacements, an underground magazine linked by tunnels to these emplacements, a lookout, a partially buried casemate structure containing store and telephone rooms, and two Depression Range Finder locations, one combined with a Battery Commander's Post set off to the east of the guns near the cliff edge and accessed via a narrow trench. Behind these, facing the salt pans ran a sunken pathway and small manning parade ground protected by a low retaining wall and two machine gun emplacements. An iron palisade was to further protect this battery, with gates toward the northern end of the rear wall. Druitt used day labour under the control of the Government Foreman of Works, Mr A McMillan, to complete this work.

The Kissing Point battery was revised only slightly during construction, a process essentially complete by June 1891 at a cost of £3500, before Druitt moved on to Thursday Island to begin work on the Green Hill Fort (listed on the Commonwealth Heritage List). He also supervised the fortification work at Magazine Island but this was delayed by renovations and extensions to the harbour. The battery guns at Kissing Point - two 6-inch (150 mm) breech-loading guns had been mounted by October 1892, when officials were awaiting delivery of the range instruments. In total the Kissing Point battery was estimated to cost £7000, this sum comprising £3000 for the guns, £3000 for artillery and submarine mining stores, and 1000 for contingencies. In 1892 another £700 was loaned for the completion of these works, bringing the actual cost without ordinance to just over £4000.

Various buildings - raised off the ground on timber stumps, framed and clad in timber and roofed with corrugated iron - were erected near to the fortification, on the relatively flat land to its south to provide accommodation for the battery garrison; however the precise location of these buildings is not certain. They included officer's and sergeant's quarters, a recreation room, barracks, a kitchen and stables. The officer's quarters building was likely an earlier residence constructed between two rocky outcrops on the headland for the Inspector of Police soon after 1883. It was associated with two portions of land adjacent to the south-western corner of the Kissing Point reserve. About 2 acres (0.81 ha) in area, the larger portion was first gazetted for Police Purposes in 1883 before being re-gazetted for Defence Force Purposes in 1892, possibly when the other buildings associated with the Fort were constructed. A 1900 plan contained in the Fort Record Book indicates they were grouped together and other evidence suggests they were located on the larger of the portions along the northern end of Mitchell Street. They had all been removed from the site by the late 1960s.

In 1900 yet another comprehensive report on the state of the colony's defence was prepared and the fortification at Kissing Point was discussed in terms of its purpose in repelling attack from the north and the proposed use of the open ground behind the battery for a depot with seven days of reserves. It was at this time that the first adjustments to the battery occurred when air funnels and windsails for ventilation were installed in the roof of the casemate store. In 1905 a new Battery Commander's Post and Depression Range Finder, located between the lookout and the casemate, was installed. In 1936 the original 6-inch (150 mm) guns were replaced by two 4.7-inch (120 mm) guns. One of the original 6-inch (150 mm) guns was thrown over the cliffs at Kissing Point only to be salvaged in 1970 and installed at one of the gun emplacements in recent years.

Despite the fact that by Federation (1901) Charters Towers had become the second largest town in Queensland, and Townsville - the State's second port in terms of tonnage handled and passenger numbers - its link to the outside world; a Colonial Defence Committee remarked in 1906 that it was "not suitable as a harbour of refuge for ocean-going shipping on account of the shallowness of its entrance channel" and that the town had no resources of strategic importance. A final blow was struck when Field Marshall Lord Kitchener completed his defence survey in 1909, and disparagingly remarked that the "nice little fort" at Kissing Point was constituted of a prettily situated barracks and a few out-of-date guns. He declared that the fixed defences at Townsville were obsolete in his report of 1911 and not worth maintaining.

The Kennedy Regiment remained part of the Queensland Defence Force until 1903 when it came under the control of the Australian Government following Federation and the centralisation of defence matters it heralded. It was then reorganised as the 1st Battalion, Kennedy Regiment with an establishment of four rifle companies. As a colonial regiment it had been involved in the breaking of the 1891 Shearer's Strike at Barcaldine. This event and the 1890 maritime strike were both seminal influences on the terms of the Commonwealth Defence Act 1903, which explicitly prevented the raising of a regular infantry and prohibited the citizen army from being used in industrial disputes. More than ten percent of the membership of the Kennedy Regiment served in the Boer War in 1899 during which it earned its first battle honour. During the First World War many Kennedy Regiment men volunteered for the Australian Imperial Force and served with the 31st Battalion in France. Here its members again earned battle honours, including Private Patrick Joseph Bugden, an original member of the Regiment, who earned the Victoria Cross for his actions during the Battle of Passchendaele in September 1917.

The 31st Battalion was disbanded in March 1919, but in 1921 the militia reformed to perpetuate the designations and battle honours of the Australian Imperial Force. It became the 31st Battalion (Kennedy Regiment). From this time until the commencement of World War II it, along with other members of the Northern defence forces, used the area around the Kissing Point fortification for training, drills and annual encampments. In the years following WWI defence spending was reduced and public and political interest in military matters declined. All the land, including Norman Park, and the three parcels associated with the Kissing Point fort, was surveyed in 1938. Despite the constant use of the area, the buildings and fortification constructed in the early 1890s remained the only permanent structures on the site. From the late 1930s topsoil was gradually introduced to establish lawns and gardens, stabilize the site's sandy base and prevent the movement of unconsolidated sands.

When war was declared in September 1939 the north Queensland infantry battalions were mobilised and marched into encampments at Townsville Showgrounds and Kissing Point Barracks for training and guard duty; the existing facilities and grounds at Kissing Point being occupied by the 26th Infantry Battalion, 11th Brigade of the Citizen Militia Force. In 1940 the Queensland Main Roads Commission built permanent foundations and engine rooms for two searchlights at the Kissing Point battery (marked on a 1948 site place as being in the immediate vicinity of the gun emplacements) and two new 4.7-inch (120 mm) guns were installed. Few changes were made at the site until after the Japanese had attacked Pearl Harbor and the Malay Peninsula in 1941 and Singapore had fallen the following year. Townsville would become a major supply and deployment centre for Australasian and US troops and the RAAF aerodrome in the suburb of Garbutt became one of the largest air bases in the Pacific.

In 1941 the area to the south-west of the fortification had been renamed Jezzine Barracks after a town in south Lebanon, Jezzine, where members of the 31st Battalion had been involved in a battle, part of the Australian 7th Division's advance on Beirut during the Allied Syria-Lebanon campaign, that had defeated French Vichy forces. Members of the Kennedy Regiment had volunteered for the Second Australian Imperial Force and would receive 43 decorations during the conflict. At this time the extent of development over the site included: a group of 19 huts, many of which were P1 type huts; three buildings along Mitchell Street dating from the 19th century; tents on the parade ground; and some long sheds on Cook Street where the Bellman Hangar stands today (1/SP211556). The P1 hut was a type of modular building designed by the Australian Army in the late 1920s and employed to answer the urgent need for accommodation engendered by the radically different nature of World War II in relation to the experience of it on Australian soil. This "total war" situation required the accommodation of greatly increased numbers of both the traditional arms of the military and also the plethora of people and operations required by the new technologies of air power and armour. The basic module of the series was the P1 Sleeping or Stores hut, which could be modified to produce such things as guard huts, messes, medical aid posts, classrooms and offices. It was rectangular in plan, raised on stumps, made with a timber frame, various wall cladding and a gable roof. They were designed to be made of readily available local materials and constructed by local contractors using common building techniques. Tens of thousands of P1 huts were built across Australia between 1939 and 1945; but despite being conceived of as temporary their adaptability and inherent strength meant they survived on many military sites long after WWII ended. However, more recently, changes in the standards of accommodation demanded by the standing armed forces, which were formed in the wake of that conflict, have meant these huts have disappeared from sites where they were once plentiful. This has occurred Australia-wide. Five of those still on the Jezzine Barracks site are in situ.

By 1943 the immediate threat of Japanese seaborne attack had passed and the war had begun to move north, so the need for a coastal anti-aircraft defence battery at Kissing Point was eliminated. During 1943 the 4.7-inch (120 mm) guns were removed to the Cape Pallarenda Coastal Battery. A photograph from this period shows that the iron palisade constructed with the fortification in 1891 was still in place. Another shows parts of the site around the parade ground were used as a fuel dump and building materials store. The emphasis of war efforts shifted to long range anti-aircraft defence and Townsville became a major garrison town and logistics base.

Following WWII Jezzine Barracks was used as a base for various units including the 31st Battalion or Kennedy Regiment. In 1947 the Australian Regular Army had formed and was to be supported by a reorganised Citizen Military Force. This force became the basis of the national service scheme instituted by the Australian Government in 1951 and Jezzine Barracks from 1955 was used as a training depot for these groups. A flagstaff and base was removed from the American War Cemetery at Belgian Gardens, after the bodies were exhumed for repatriation in 1946, and installed at the fortification site.

From the late 1940s the Army erected a number of other P1 type huts on the barracks site, in addition to those erected during the course of the war. Roads were gradually formalised, generally being extensions of the town street grid. By 1952 a Bellman Hangar, a prefabricated metal-framed and -clad structure designed to be re-located with ease, was brought from an unknown location and had been erected on Cook Street to serve as a warehouse. In 1957 the original Kissing Point defence reserve was subdivided and a lot on its eastern end was transferred to the Townsville City Council where they built a rock-enclosed, ocean bathing pool. Between 1962 and 1964 the 31st Royal Queensland Regiment headquarters administration building and training depot was constructed of brick and concrete over one level (3/SP211556). Other facilities for a modern professional army populated the site, including six married-quarters houses along the north-eastern end of Howitt Street. During this time many of the earlier, nineteenth century buildings on site were demolished. In the late 1960s the WWII searchlight emplacements in the Kissing Point fortification were demolished, the 1891 gun emplacements and magazine partially destroyed and filled in, and the casemate retained in use as a store, a process which represented substantial changes to the fortification site. It was after the mid-1960s that Lavarack Barracks, also in Townsville to the south-west of the Townsville CBD and Castle Hill, was developed and the Shoalwater Bay Training Area north-east of Rockhampton established, Jezzine Barracks being too constrained by urban development by this time to accommodate such expansion. Jezzine House (4/SP211556) was built in 1993, on a site very near to where the police inspector's residence was erected in c. 1883.

In 1979 a team headed by the Army Museum of North Queensland Committee of Management and assisted by many Army and local volunteers began the work of remaking what had been destroyed at the Kissing Point fortification just over a decade before, uncovering what had been buried and generally returning it to what was deemed to be its original state. With the permission of the Townsville Harbour Board, several steel door frames and lintels were taken from the Magazine Island Battery and installed at Kissing Point. The Museum opened in the Casemate Store Rooms in 1980. A memorial to the centenary of the 31st Battalion, Kennedy Regiment, was installed against the fortification's landward stone retaining wall in 1986.

The fortification completed at Magazine Island not long after that at Kissing Point and intended to work in concert with it, was identified as being of no further value for military purposes and free for disposal by the Commonwealth in 1919. The Townsville Harbour Board was leased the site before being offered the freehold on the property in 1927. It leased the land to two oil companies and proceeded to demolish all but the original battery complex by 1929. These were demolished in 1983–4, in the final stage of the harbour's expansion.

In 1997 Jezzine Barracks, including the outcrop where the Kissing Point fortifications stand, was identified by the Australian Government as a potentially disposable land holding, a decision that instigated a round of studies and community consultation to establish what this would entail and how the site's heritage values would be retained. The public, through community activism illustrated in numerous newspaper articles, formation of a lobbying alliance and representations to local members of both Queensland and Australian parliaments, demonstrated its strong concern regarding these issues. Members of the local council also voiced concern about the future of the site, its importance to the community and the need for it to be used for public purposes. The fortifications were added to the Commonwealth Heritage List in 2004. In 2006 a public announcement was made by the Australian Government that certain parts of the site would be gifted to the Townsville City Council as Trustees, while the Australian Government would retain ownership of the headquarters building and Jezzine House, which remains the residence of the highest-ranking officer in the region despite all troops having been shifted to Lavarack Barracks in 2007. To enable this partial transfer of land the entire site was configured into seven lots and the internal roads were formalised. Prior to the transfer of land to the Townsville City Council, as a part of its remediation of the site, the Department of Defence removed most of the structures on 1 and 6/SP211556.

== Description ==
The military site at North Ward in Townsville - as bounded by Cook, Isley, Mitchell and Howitt Streets and the threshold of littoral land and cliffs facing the ocean - consists of two main precincts: the Kissing Point fortification and Jezzine Barracks. These occupy seven recently configured allotments. The fortification sits on a rocky outcrop in the north-east corner of the site, while the barracks spreads out at its feet to the west and south and is arranged around a series of roads. The heritage boundary in the Queensland Heritage Register encompasses the whole of the Kissing Point fortification and part of the Barracks complex.

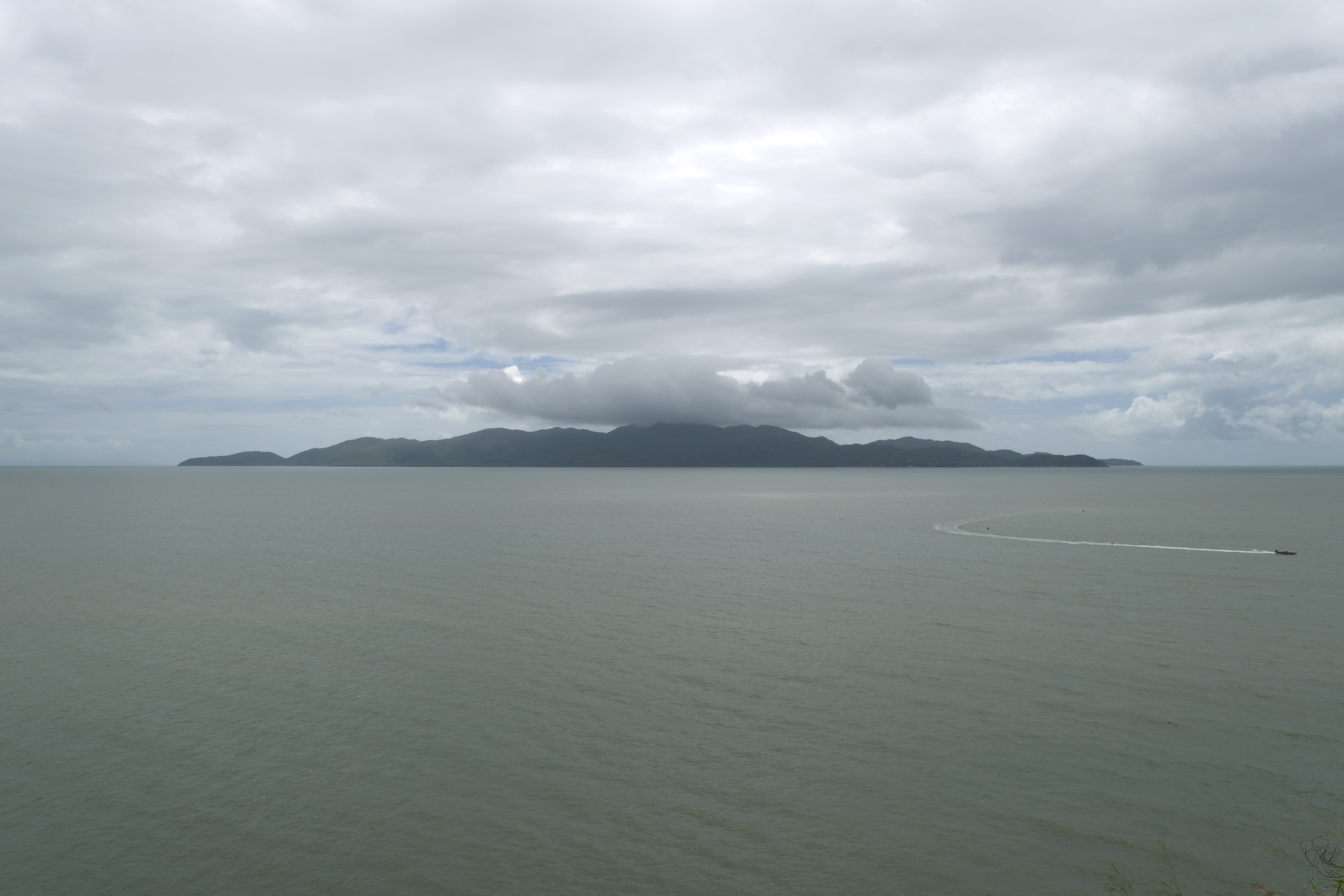
View of Magnetic Island from the Kissing Point fortifications.

The views from the site, particularly those gained from the vantage point of the fortification, are panoramic and take in Pallarenda Beach and the Cape Pallarenda to the north-west, The Strand beach and Townsville harbour in the fore to middle grounds, and then Magnetic Island to the north and Mount Elliot to the south-east, both in the distance across Cleveland Bay. These views and the wider landscape of which they form a part are highly valued by the community and are bound up in the siting of the fortification for coastal defence purposes and the sense of security it has afforded Townsville since 1891.

Around the landward side of the outcrop where the fortification is sited are a number of stone retaining walls, the date of which is unknown.

=== Kissing Point fortifications ===
Sited on the easternmost of two rocky outcrops that occupy the headland separating Rowes Bay and Cleveland Bay about 2.5 kilometres (1.6 mi) north of Townsville city centre, the Kissing Point fortification comprises: two gun emplacements, an underground magazine and a casemate store, one machine gun position, a lookout and two Depression range finder (DRF) positions organised along a broad sunken pathway formed by an embanked parapet on one side and a long, low sandstone block retaining wall on the other, which opens out to form a small manning parade ground. Formal access to the fortification is via a roadway adjoining the northern end of the structure, while a track at the opposite end leads from the end of The Strand. The cliffs of the headland, the foreshore below and the ocean form the eastern perimeter of the fortification, while to the west a partially grassed and treed band of ground gives way after a steep, short slope to the eastern side of the Jezzine Barracks site.

The sunken pathway runs from the north-west to the south-east following the general contours and shape of the outcrop. Off its seaward edge are arranged, from north to south, the casemate with its tall red brick facade and three rooms recessed into the earth, the 1905 DRF and Battery Commander's Post, the lookout, the first gun emplacement, the magazine structure, and then the second gun emplacement. Forming the landward edge of the pathway is a low retaining wall of rough stone blocks. Into this are inserted one machine gun position opposite the casemate and the manning parade in the southern corner. Set off from the southernmost gun emplacement by approximately 18 metres (59 ft) is another DRF position.

==== Casemate or underground store rooms ====
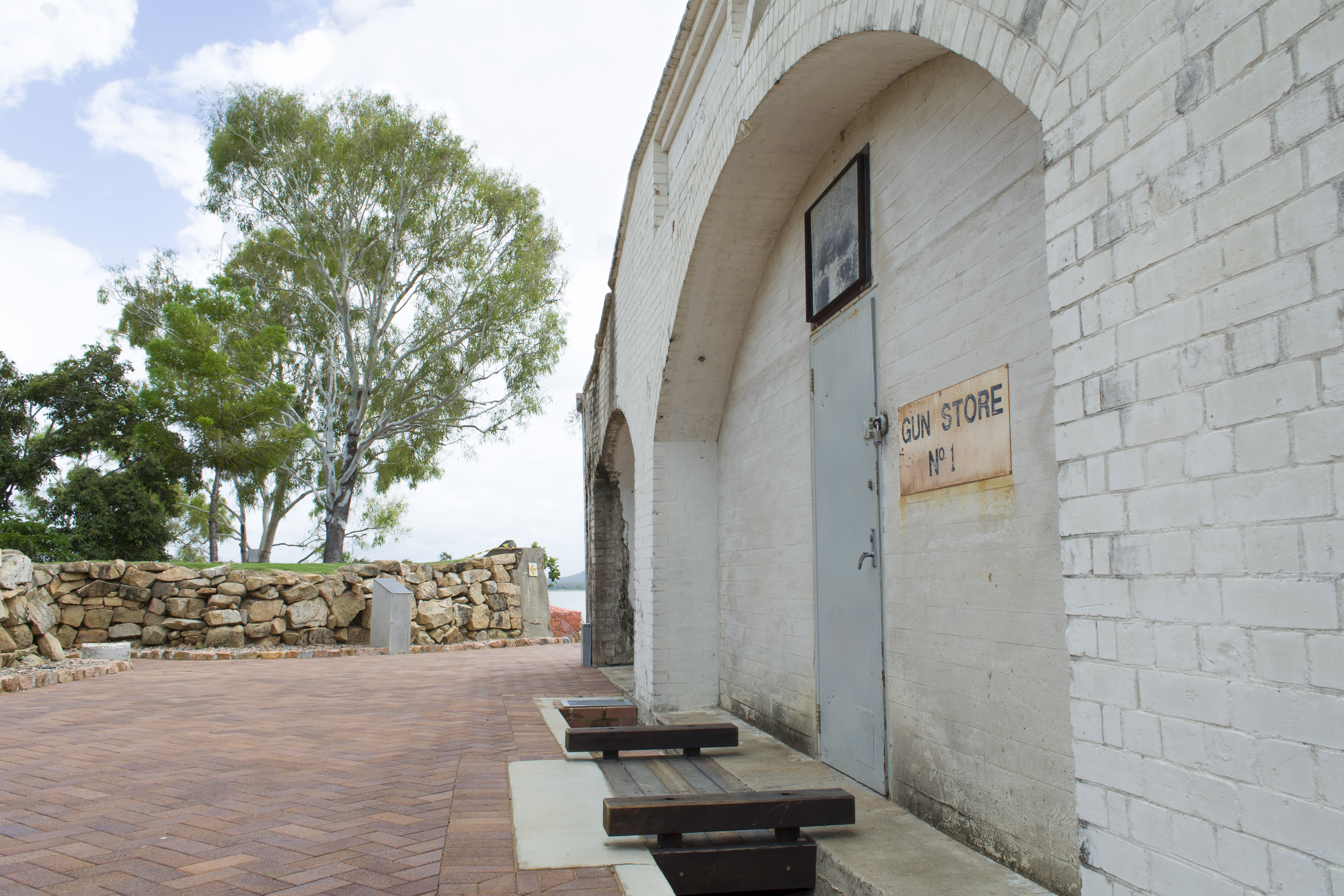
Store room

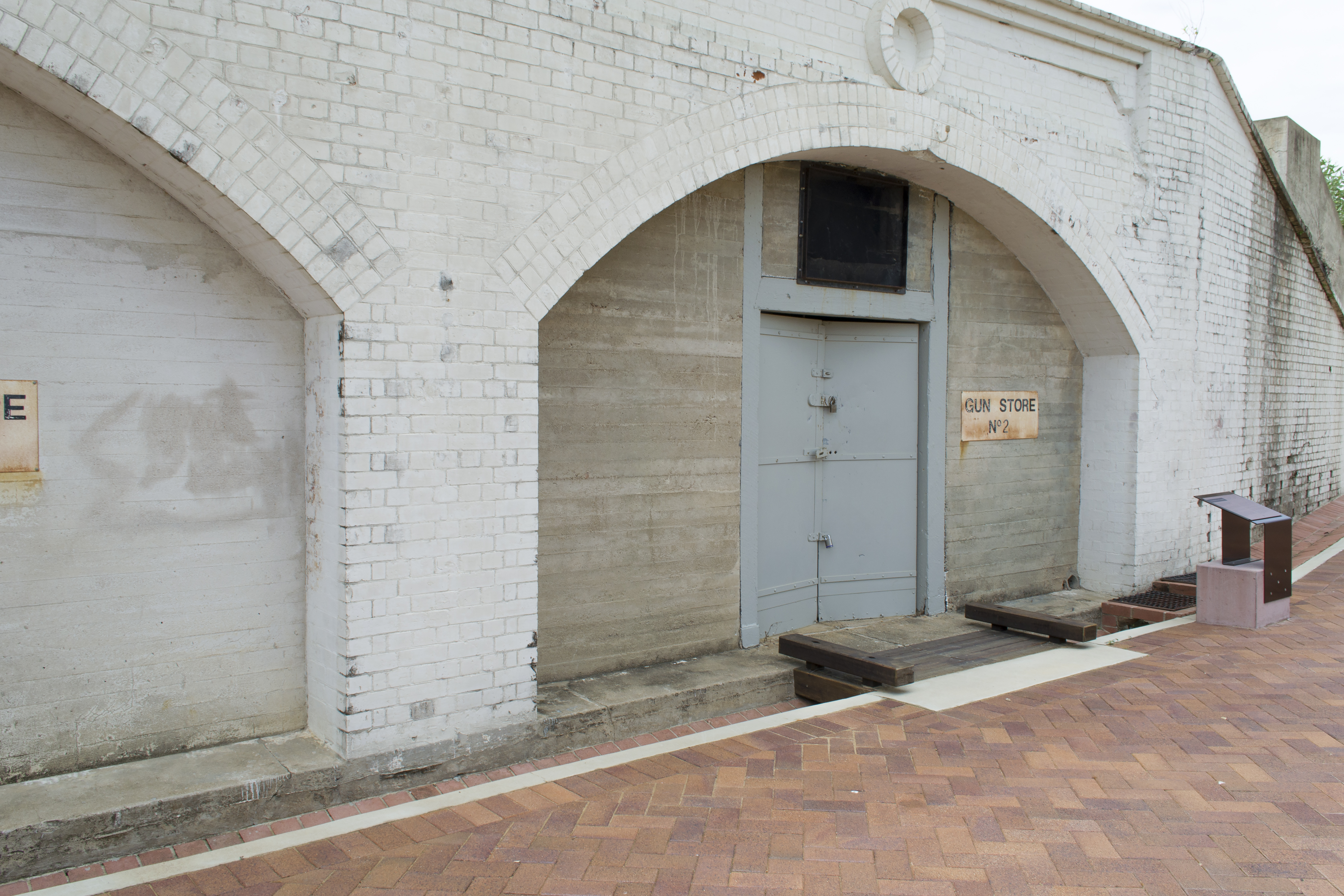
Store rooms at Kissing Point

This structure is recessed into the earth and features concrete outer retaining walls, a concrete roof fitted with six steel vents and a commanding red brick facade addressing the sunken pathway, the west and a small machine gun emplacement. Done in Old English bond, this wall face is about five metres along its highest section connected to sloping side wings also constructed of brick. Three arched openings in this facade, about four metres wide, have been variously in-filled; two with concrete and a central strip of steel containing single steel doors and the last with steel partitioning and a central steel door. Above the archways are small circular openings that have been in-filled. Inside are three barrel-vaulted underground rooms or bays, the thick separating walls of which are brick and feature a number of doorways. The larger two rooms were for storage and measured about 8.5 by 5.5 metres (28 ft × 18 ft) in plan and 3 metres (9.8 ft) high. The telephone room measures about 3.65 by 3 metres (12.0 ft × 9.8 ft) and almost 2.8 metres (9 ft 2 in) at the highest line of the vault. New quarry tile flooring has been installed throughout and all other interior surfaces have been painted sometime after 1997.

==== Lookout ====
This feature comprises a narrow passageway and stairs sunk into the earth and opening into the eastern side of the pathway, at the end of which is a sheltered lookout point. Its sides are retained with concrete walling that project a few centimetres above the ground.

==== Magazine ====
This brick and concrete structure comprises a series of rooms, corridors and trenches largely recessed into the earth that were used for the safe storage of ammunition and its protected delivery to the gun emplacements on either side. Opposing steep flights of stairs give access to a central bay of small, partly underground rooms, over which further side stairs give access to a long platform forming part of the roof to these spaces. A narrow passageway or trench led from this platform to a small DRF trench, square in plan with rounded corners, sitting near the sea cliffs. A slight depression corresponding to its general dimensions is all the remains above ground of this feature. The facade of the magazine is face brick done in Old English bond with two openings, an arched steel doorway and an arched window. Steel grilles fill the arches. Inside the magazine itself are a number of small rooms opening off a lobby and enclosed by a narrow corridor called a lamp passage. The rear room was the shell store. To the rear of these is another space from which lead two opposing passageways or tunnels connect to the gun emplacements via a gently sloping floor. The interior walls are recently painted brick, while the vaulted ceilings are off-form concrete as are the floors. There were once cartridge lifting devices at the ends of these tunnels used to raise the ammunition to the gun pit level. The associated openings were sealed during restoration in 1979–1980. The walls feature various recesses. A number of brick-lined ventilation shafts project from three of the rooms in the magazine; however, only one has an early steel vent attached. This structure has been much restored as it was partly demolished during the 1960s. Painted steel tubular handrails are fitted to the stairs and open ledges. A large gravel bed has been laid over the general footprint of the northern tunnel, while two BBQs have been installed to the south, as well as a smaller gravel bed and a memorial wall.

==== Gun emplacements ====
The two gun emplacements comprise a generally circular platform retained by semi-circles of concrete parapet walling to the east and accessed by stairs from the sunken pathway. Each parapet wall connects to the cartridge lift locations where the magazine tunnels end and feature a number of recesses known as expense magazines where various shell and cartridge components were stored before loading of the guns. In the centre of the circular platform is a concrete upstand or dwarf platform where two guns are currently mounted. The easternmost gun is a 6-inch (150 mm) Armstrong Mark V Coastal Defence Gun (Serial No. 7469) which investigation has shown was one of those installed at Kissing Point in 1892 and later salvaged from a crevice in the nearby cliff face. The westernmost gun is a 6-inch (150 mm) Armstrong breech loading gun (Serial No. 3777) that was part of the arsenal of Magazine Island Fort and acquired by the Army Museum of North Queensland in 1983–1984 when it was finally demolished.

==== Depression range finder (DRF) positions ====
These are mounting positions for DRFs and comprise a small trench about a metre and a half square and half a metre deep. In the centre on a base is a concrete pedestal where the DRF was mounted. At Kissing Point the northernmost of these (installed 1905) is accessed via a set of narrow concrete stairs and sits between the casemate and lookout, it and its access way sunk into the battered earth and natural rock. This position retains part of the steel fixing at the top of the pillar to which the DRF was attached. Another sat above the magazine (described above); while the other sits off about 18 metres (59 ft) to the south-east of the southernmost gun emplacement near the cliff edge. It is formed with concrete walls in five facets and a slab. It is about half a metre deep with a central pedestal and a short flight of stairs leading into its south-east side. The narrow trench that connected this position to the sunken pathway is no longer evident.

==== Manning parade ground ====
The manning parade ground consists of an area of flat ground enclosed on three sides by the low stone retaining wall that forms the landward defence of the fortification. There are simple garden beds ranged against its three sides.

==== Machine gun position ====
This is a small semicircle of ground sheltered by the low retaining wall sited opposite the casemate store. There is no longer evidence of the machine gun position located in the south-east corner of the parade ground.

==== Memorials ====
The American War Cemetery flagstaff sits between the sea cliffs and the magazine and features eight memorial bronze plaques at its base. Nearby is another memorial comprising a low wall with an undulating cap. A further memorial is set off from the low retaining wall about halfway along its length and comprises a standing stone with a plaque commemorating the centenary of 31st Battalion, the Kennedy Regiment.

=== Jezzine Barracks ===
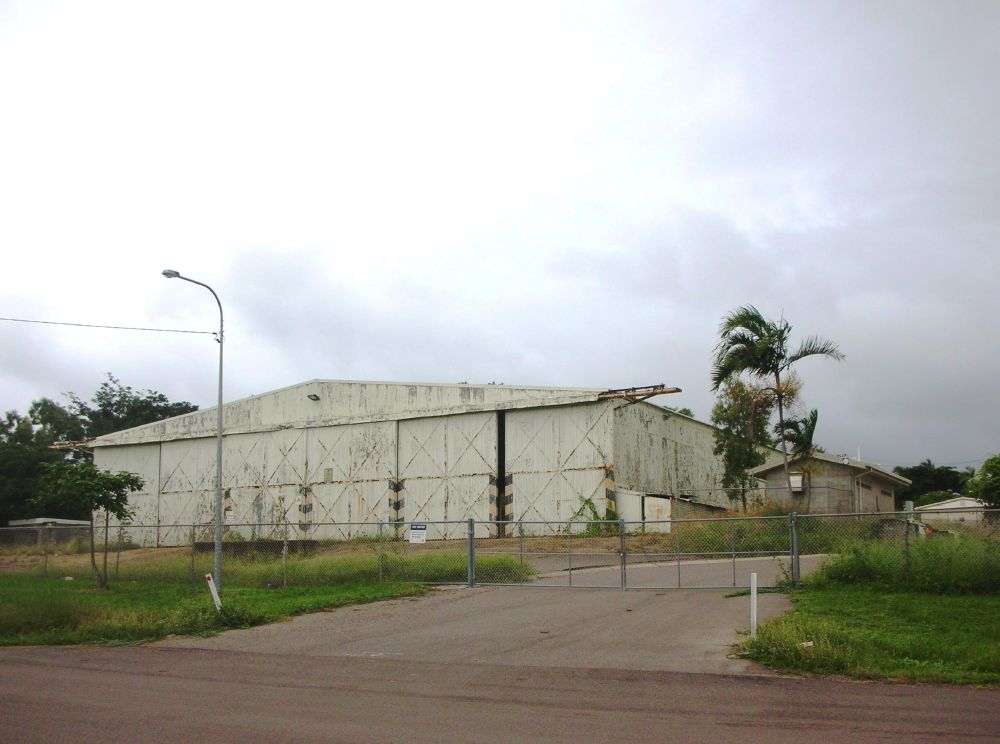
Jezzine Barracks

The Jezzine Barracks complex consisted of five main areas of development aside from the fortification (above) and the parade ground (see below). The first, to the south-west of the fortification outcrop, was characterised by a range of small single-storey, steel- framed sheds and timber-framed and -clad huts with either gabled or skillion roofs of corrugated steel arranged around a series of secondary roadways and open drainage lines. The second area, to the south of the fortification and strung along the easterly end of Howitt Street, featured six timber-framed and -clad married quarters houses on tall stumps (mid-1960s). The third and fourth areas, adjacent to the west of the fortification outcrop, are dominated by the structures of Jezzine House (1993) and the 31 RQR headquarters building (1962–1964). The former comprises a double-storey, rendered masonry structure with decorative timber detailing set amongst mature gardens and on higher ground accessed via a sweeping drive. The latter concrete and masonry building is planned around an internal courtyard. It comprises offices and a porticoed entrance that addresses the parade ground; and a drill hall and mess rooms at the rear. The fifth area, to the far west along Cook Street, has most recently been the headquarters of the 11 Brigade and features: the Bellman Hangar (early 1950s) and a large open space between it and the intersection with Howitt Street enclosed by trees along Cook Street.

==== P1 type huts ====
To the immediate south-west of the remains of the entrance gates to the fortification are situated five P1 type huts, which appear to remain in the positions they had obtained early in World War II. Rectangular in plan, these timber-framed huts have gable roofs, the ridges of which run north-west to south-east. Roof cladding is profiled steel, while the eaves are unlined. They are all raised to varying heights off the sloping ground on prefabricated, concrete stumps. External walls are single skin with the frame exposed on the interior, while internal partitions are similarly framed with silky oak infill panels. The original cladding of vertically jointed timber remains extant on each hut. All feature aluminium-framed louvers and sliders. A single board door opens from the short end of each hut onto a short flight of timber stairs. Surrounding the huts is a series of concrete paths and open drains lined with sandstone blocks. These are oriented with the huts. Within the north-facing courtyard formed by these huts is a large, half-buried sandstone boulder inscribed with the date 1901.

==== Parade ground ====
The parade ground addresses Howitt Street and has been enclosed by north-westerly extensions of Mitchell and Eyre Streets onto the Barracks site (formation complete by 1952) and another sealed road running between these and in front of the 31 RQR headquarters building. It is necessarily flat and grassed with some trees lining its perimeter, most notably those to the north and north-east.

== Army Museum of North Queensland ==
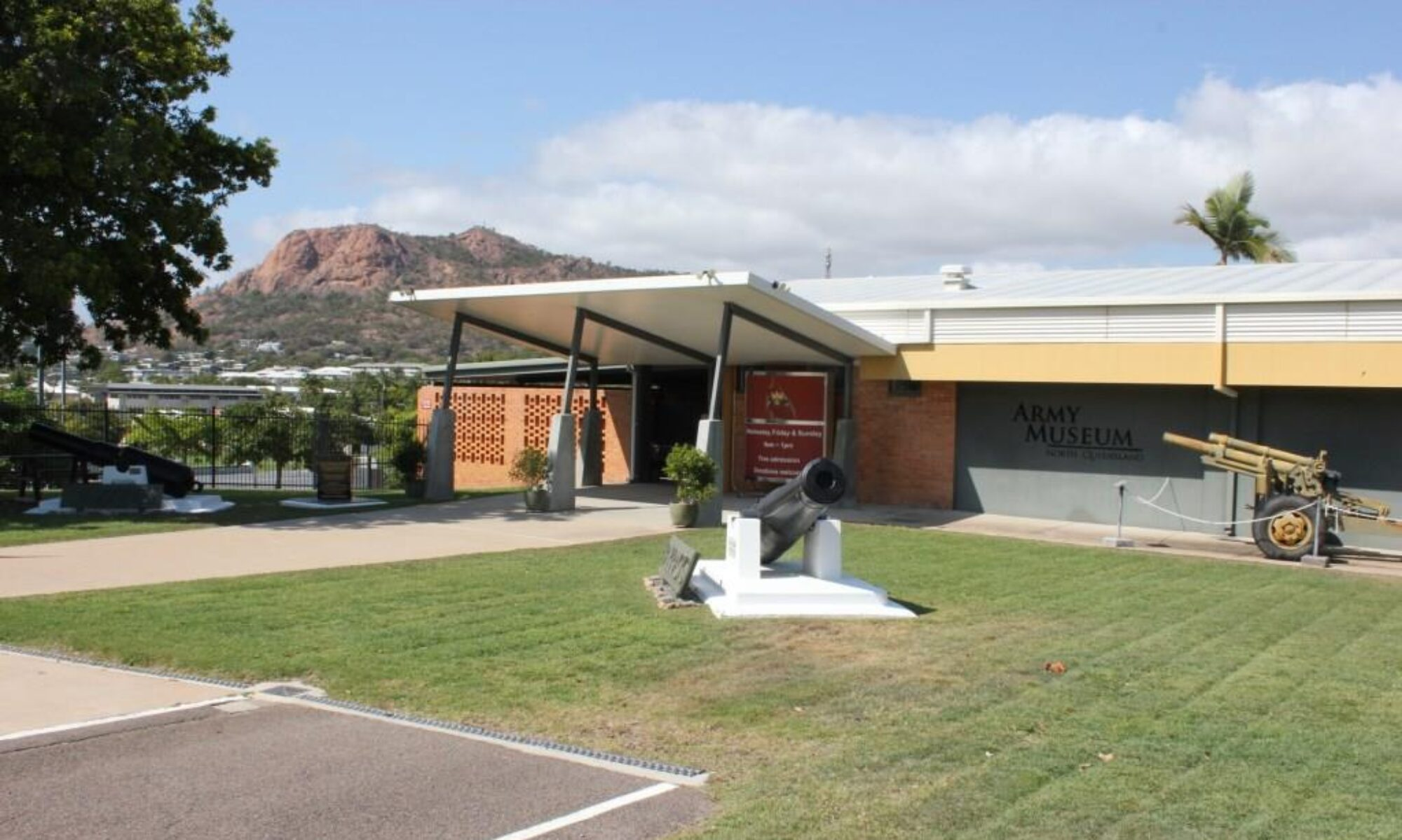
Jezzine Barracks, Kissing Point Museum

The Army Museum of North Queensland is located in a refurbished building in the Jezzine Barracks and focuses on the history of the Australian Army in North Queensland. Exhibits include photos, weapons, artillery, uniforms, regalia and more. There are dioramas with historic items related to the Colonial era, World War I and World War II, the Vietnam and Korean Wars, and modern day operations. There is also a display about Sir John Lavarack and Lavarack Barracks.

== Heritage listing ==
Kissing Point Fortification and part of Jezzine Barracks were listed on the Queensland Heritage Register on 5 February 2010 having satisfied the following criteria.

The place is important in demonstrating the evolution or pattern of Queensland's history.

Constructed in 1891 on a headland affording panoramic views of the northern and eastern approaches to Townsville harbour, the small fortification at Kissing Point evocatively demonstrates theories and practices regarding fixed points of coastal defence working in concert with naval power, which had considerable currency in the late nineteenth century after all Imperial garrisons had been withdrawn from the Australian colonies. These types of fortifications were built at various points of strategic importance - such as Lytton and Green Hill on Thursday Island, also in Queensland; Fort Scratchley and Bare Island Fort in New South Wales; Fort Queenscliff and others on Port Phillip Bay in Victoria; and Fort Glanville in South Australia - and provide important evidence of how the colonies devised and operated their own schemes of defence. The Kissing Point fortification highlights the role Townsville played as an early, important Queensland port serving a vibrant regional economy.

The low-lying land to the south and west of the fort, where Jezzine Barracks developed during World War II, was used from 1887 for regular training and from 1889 for annual encampments by north Queensland military forces, including militia, national service and cadet units, battalions mobilised during both world wars, and the 31st Battalion North Queensland Regiment, formed in 1947 as a continuation of the Kennedy Regiment. Evidence of this long pattern of military use remains extant in the parade ground occupying 7/SP211556. The five P1 huts associated with the Barracks, installed in their current location during World War II in the south-western quadrant of 5/SP211556, are important and increasingly rare icons of Australia's participation in this conflict, the outbreak of which precipitated an unparalleled and urgent defence build up on home soil that relied heavily on prefabricated structures.

The place has potential to yield information that will contribute to an understanding of Queensland's history.

The Kissing Point fortification and the site immediately surrounding it has experienced a significant amount of disturbance during two key phases of demolition and restoration; first in the late 1960s and then in 1979–80; however it may still provide valuable archaeological evidence of the design and construction responses made to adapt these kinds of standard battery designs to local conditions. As it belongs to a colonial system of defence that stretches along the entire east coast of Australia, the Kissing Point fortifications would benefit from and add detail to the body of evidence gleaned from these other locations.

The place is important in demonstrating the principal characteristics of a particular class of cultural places.

The Kissing Point fortification is important in demonstrating the principal characteristics of a nineteenth century coastal battery, of which there were only four built in Queensland (three extant, one demolished), and remain a significant demonstration of the State's pre-aviation military strategy and technology. The surviving fabric provides a snapshot of this period of international conflict and the approach to coastal defence of the newly self-governing colonies of Australia. The battery at Kissing Point retains its relevant, original parts - two gun emplacements, an underground magazine, depression range finder locations, a lookout, casemate store rooms, a machine gun position, and a manning parade ground. Also remaining uncompromised is the relationship between these elements enclosed within an embanked, seaward parapet and a landward retaining wall, and the panoramic views of the wider littoral and marine landscape, which was an essential component of its defensive purpose.

The Kissing Point fortification is an important example of the work of the designer and construction supervisor, Major Edward Druitt RE, who made a significant contribution to the defence of Queensland in the late nineteenth century as a military engineer engaged on this installation, and others on Magazine and Thursday Islands. In addition the place is an important example of the strategic defence planning work of Lieutenant-Colonel PH Scratchley who implemented the ideas central to the 1877 scheme of defence for Queensland devised by Sir WFD Jervois and himself, and later extended them when he advised specific measures for the defence of Townsville including fortification of Kissing Point. These recommendations were made to the Queensland government at a time when all the Australian colonies had to defend themselves without the aid of Imperial garrisons against a number of potential threats in the Pacific region. Scratchley played a key role in this national system of coastal defence.

The place is important because of its aesthetic significance.

Kissing Point belongs to a coastal landscape of granite outcrops, headlands and hills around Townsville, which forms a backdrop to the Great Barrier Reef Natural World Heritage Area, a vast territory of scenery recognised internationally for its biological, zoological and geological qualities. The wide-ranging views the fortification affords north-west to Cape Pallarenda, west to Magnetic Island and south-east over Cleveland Bay and the harbour to Mount Elliot have been valued by generations of visitors to the site. It has also displayed landmark qualities for people who have appreciated the Point from other vantage points around Townsville and Cleveland Bay since early in the settlement's history.

The place has a strong or special association with a particular community or cultural group for social, cultural or spiritual reasons.

Kissing Point fortification and Jezzine Barracks have strong associations for both the military and civilian communities of Townsville as a source of security and pride, evident since the earliest annual encampments held at the site in the late 1880s. These associations also are bound up in the aesthetic appeal of its location and the 45-kilometre (28 mi) range of views afforded across the city to Castle Hill, and over Cleveland Bay and Rowes Bay. This community attachment to the place was evidenced by widespread concern after the site was identified for disposal in 1997 and the widely supported public campaign that resulted in the transfer of the place to the Townsville City Council in trust in 2009, specifically for public use and benefit.

The place has a special association with the life or work of a particular person, group or organisation of importance in Queensland's history.

The Kissing Point fortification, the Jezzine Barracks P1 huts and its parade ground taken together are significant for their almost continuous association with the Kennedy Regiment, one of Queensland's oldest military units. First formed in 1886 in Townsville; it continued with one designation or another within the Federation-era Queensland militia forces; then contributed members to the two Imperial Forces that served in World Wars I and II and who garnered battle honours during both conflicts, later operated as a battalion and briefly as a company of the Australian Army, and was headquartered at the Barracks from 1947 until 2007.
