= Edward Druitt =

British military officer

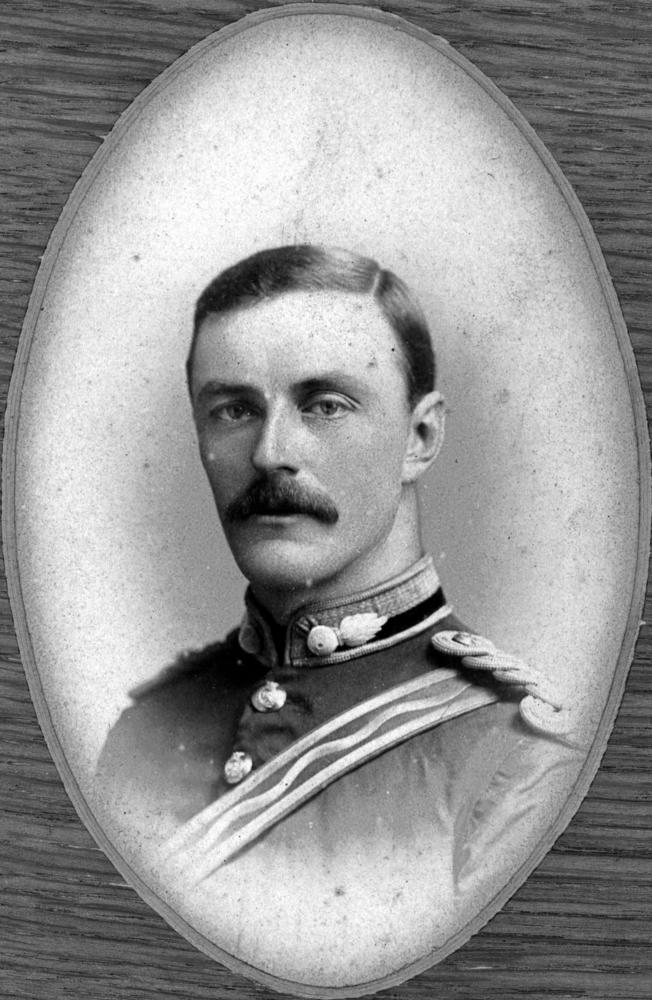
- Born: 19 April 1859; Wimborne Minster, Dorset, England
- Died: 25 July 1922 (aged 63); Edinburgh, Scotland
- Relatives: Montague Druitt
- Military career
- Allegiance: United Kingdom
- Branch: British Army
- Service years: 1878–1900
- Rank: Lieutenant Colonel
- Unit: Royal Engineers
- Other work: Railway inspector

Lieutenant Colonel Edward Druitt (19 April 1859 – 25 July 1922) was a British military engineering officer principally known as an inspecting officer of the Railways Inspectorate in the early twentieth century.

== Early life and family ==
Edward Druitt was born in Wimborne Minster, Dorset, England. He was from an upper-middle-class background and the third son and fourth child of prominent local surgeon William Druitt, and his wife Ann (née Harvey). William Druitt was a justice of the peace, a governor of the local grammar school, and a regular worshipper at the local Anglican church, the Minster. The Druitts lived at Westfield House, which was the largest house in the town, and set in its own grounds with stables and servants' cottages. Druitt had six brothers and sisters, including an elder brothers William who entered the practice of law, and Montague who was a barrister and historically was suspected of being Jack the Ripper.

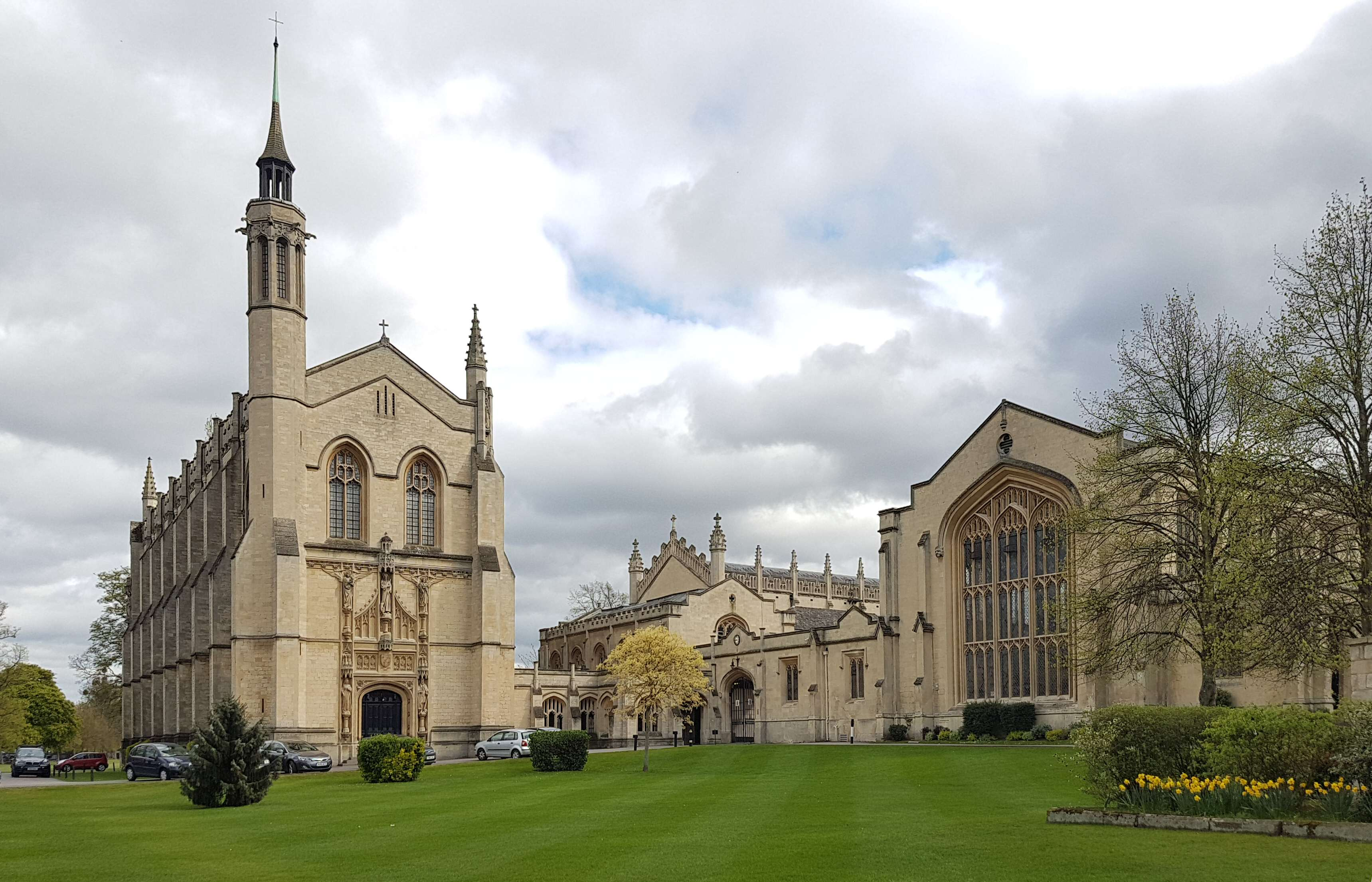
Cheltenham College chapel and library

Druitt's father died suddenly from a heart attack in September 1885, leaving an estate valued at £16,579 (equivalent to £1,842,000 today).

Druitt converted to Catholicism whilst based with the army at Chatham in February 1887. In February 1889 he married Christina-Mary-Filumea Weld, the eldest daughter of Sir Frederick Aloysius Weld, a member of a prominent Catholic family in the West Country.

== Career ==
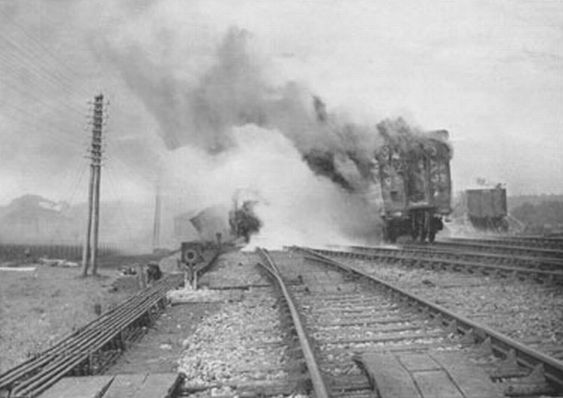
A burning carriage in the aftermath of the Quintinshill rail accident, 22 May 1915

Druitt studied at Cheltenham College and the Royal Military Academy Woolwich. After graduating, he was commissioned as a lieutenant in 1878, captain in 1883, major in 1896 and finally lieutenant colonel in 1904.

His service as a military engineer included work in Australia in the 1890s where he designed and supervised the construction of Kissing Point Fortification and Green Hill Fort.

After Druitt's return to England after his Australian service, he eventually retired from the Royal Engineers around 1900 and moved to Edinburgh where he was a railway inspector for the rest of his working life. In his nearly 20-year career with the Railway Inspectorate Druitt investigated over 130 railway accidents, generally in Scotland. Druitt's most notable investigation was of the accident at Quintinshill on 22 May 1916 which remains the worst railway accident in British history with 227 fatalities.

== Death ==
Druitt died at the Craig House (at the time known as the Royal Edinburgh Asylum) in Edinburgh, Scotland on 25 July 1922. According to his death certificate he had been suffering from diabetes for four years at the time of his death.
