= Green Hill Fort =

Fortification in Australia

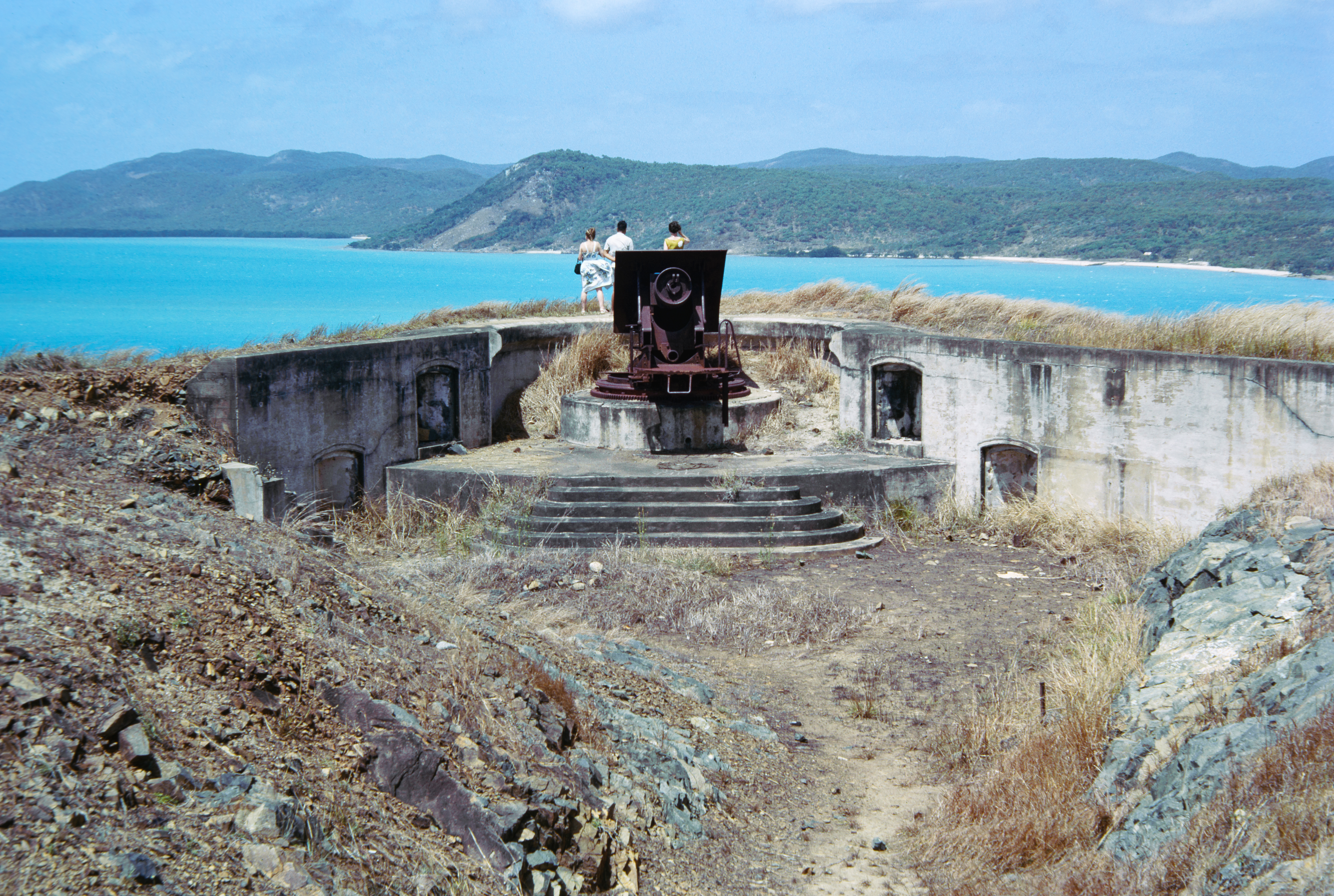
- Green Hill Fort, 1964.jpg

- Location within Queensland
- 10.5840°S 142.2110°E
- Location: Chester Street, Thursday Island, Queensland, Australia

History
- Built: 1891–1893; 133 years ago

Commonwealth Heritage List
- Official name: Green Hill Fort
- Type: Listed place (Historic)
- Designated: 28 May 2008
- Reference no.: 105419

Green Hill Fort is a heritage-listed fortification at Chester Street, Thursday Island in the Torres Strait, Queensland, Australia. The fort is important in Australian military history as a strategic coastal defence installation in the period of transition from British to Australian responsibility for defence. The 1885 confrontation between Britain and Russia, which almost resulted in open conflict, galvanised the Australian colonies to jointly fund construction of the fortifications, and these represent an important and uncommon instance of pre-Federation Colonial cooperation on defence in the "national" interest. The fort was added to the Australian Commonwealth Heritage List on 28 May 2008.

== History ==
The Green Hill Fort complex on Thursday Island was constructed between 1891 and 1893 as part of the Imperial and colonial whole-of-Australia defence in the lead up to Federation. It was erected in response to the "Russian scare" of 1885 and to late 19th century European colonial expansion into New Guinea and the South Pacific.

New South Wales, Victoria, Queensland, Western Australia and South Australia contributed to the cost of construction, Britain supplied the armament, and Queensland funded and supplied the garrison.

The office of the Queensland Colonial Architect appears to have prepared the plans for the 1890s underground magazines and store rooms, and certainly did so for the barracks and several early 20th century additions. Green Hill Fort was garrisoned from 1893 to 1926, but never fired a shot in conflict.

The importance of Torres Strait to British and Australian colonial trade and defence had been identified from at least the late 1830s. The strategic significance of the Strait was recognised officially from 1860, when both the British government and the newly established Queensland government agreed in principle to establish a port on Cape York, and that there should be a military presence in the far north of Queensland.

Somerset, on the eastern tip of Cape York, was established in 1864 by the Queensland government as a haven of refuge and coal and supply depot. The British government contributed significantly to the cost, and funded a small detachment of Royal marines until 1867.

In August 1872 Queensland annexed the islands of the Torres Strait and the Queensland government decided to remove its official settlement at Somerset to a more central location along the main shipping route through the Strait, which was the principal trade route to Asia and England. In 1877 the Queensland government removed its official port of refuge from Somerset to Thursday Island (Port Kennedy), and it became a busy port servicing passenger and trade vessels passing through Torres Strait.

In 1877 the colonial governments of New South Wales, Queensland, Victoria and South Australia, anxious to secure the land defence of their coastlines, jointly invited British Royal Engineer Colonel Sir William Jervois, assisted by Lieutenant-Colonel Peter H Scratchley, to inspect existing defence installations and recommend how they might be improved. Scratchley's particular expertise was the design and construction of deterrent coastal fortresses.

Accompanied by Scratchley, Jervois completed his investigation of New South Wales defences by the end of May and planned to go to the other colonies. At Melbourne in June he was notified of his promotion to Governor of the Colony of South Australia (he had been Governor of the Straits Settlements in Malaya). On 2 October Jervois arrived in South Australia from Melbourne on H.M.S. Sapphire and was sworn in.

After Jervois was appointed governor of South Australia, Scratchley became commissioner of defences in 1878, covering in time all six colonies and New Zealand. His plans were thorough and were largely implemented, so that by 1885 he was satisfied that "the colonies, excepting New Zealand, are fairly well prepared". His ideas had changed little since 1860 although he was aware of technological improvements. Scratchley believed that land defence works should be near key ports, advocated torpedoes for offence and submarine mines for defence, supported the obstruction of shipping channels and argued for a limited number of paid volunteers, sufficient to repel minor invasions. The clearest statements of his views appear in the evidence he gave to the 1881 Commission on New South Wales Defences, of which he was vice-president and chairman of the military sub-committee. He retained his belief that threats to Australia were limited, because of British sea power: volunteer land forces with able officers were needed only "to meet the contingency of the naval defences not meeting the enemy at sea". Opposed to copying the system of training British regulars, he argued that Australian fighting conditions would be different. Well aware of the difficulties of obtaining support for defence spending, he saw his central problem as the establishment of an effective force "at the lowest possible cost". Scratchley retired from active military service on 1 October 1882 as honorary major-general, but was still employed by the Colonial Office as defence adviser for Australia.

Jervois had identified the principal threat to Queensland security as an attack from the sea on the major ports (Brisbane, Rockhampton and Maryborough), to secure supplies and coal, not permanent occupation. Recognising the strategic position of Thursday Island at the northern entrance to Australian waters, he suggested a telegraph station be established there. In 1881 Scratchley recommended its fortification, identifying it as the connecting link between Australia and Asia. He stressed that in any Australian national scheme of defence, a fortified coaling station in the north was essential. However, Scratchley's recommendation was too costly for Queensland alone to implement.

Britain's failure to support Queensland's annexation of New Guinea in 1883, and the subsequent claiming of New Guinean territory by Germany and Britain, was followed by the 1885 confrontation between Britain and Russia, which almost resulted in open conflict. Colonial security again became an issue and galvanised both Britain and the Australian colonies into recognising that securing the coaling stations at King George's Sound in Western Australia and at Thursday Island was fundamental to the defence of Australia.

Defence became caught up in the federation debate, and only after New South Wales Premier Sir Henry Parkes announced his support for federation in October 1889, was it possible to properly address the question of national defence. At the Federation Conference of February 1890 a Colonial Defence Committee was formed and the colonies agreed to jointly fund construction of fortifications at King George's Sound and Thursday Island and to accept Britain's offer to arm these forts. The 1891 recommendations of the Colonial Defence Committee were approved by Britain and accepted by the colonial governments almost immediately, with Queensland agreeing to advance the money for construction and to recoup contributions from the other participating colonies.

Work on the site at Thursday Island commenced in August 1891. Major Edward Druitt RE of the Queensland Permanent Artillery, who oversaw construction of the Kissing Point fortifications in Townsville and made an important contribution to Queensland defence in the late 19th century, was in charge of the works. Victoria Barracks, a canteen, sergeants' mess, gun shed, guard house, and two concrete-lined underground water tanks were completed in January 1893 and the guns had been received from England by May 1893. In June 1893 a detachment of two officers and 30 men from the A Battery of the Queensland Permanent Artillery arrived at Thursday Island to take up duties.

From its completion it was clear that Green Hill Fort was designed to protect the coaling station at Port Kennedy, not to defend Torres Strait. It was designed to "bluff" rather than to defend. Late 19th century changes in military and naval technology, including longer range weapons, and ironclad cruisers made Green Hill Fort, from its inception, obsolete for anything other than protecting the coaling station.

To upgrade the defence of the strait, a 4.7 in (120 mm) gun was installed on Milman Hill in 1897, the garrison was increased from 30 to 45 and 30 local volunteers formed the Thursday Island Detachment of the North Queensland Garrison Battery. Following federation on 1 January 1901, Green Hill Fort was transferred to the Australian Government. Improvements were made to the Green Hill battery in 1912, including a new underground powder magazine, an air-conditioning system for the cordite store, and a laboratory outside the fort gate.

Thursday Island was placed on full alert at the outbreak of the World War I, but as the German threat in the Indian and Pacific Oceans subsided after 1915 the Thursday Island garrison was removed to active service. Green Hill Fort served as a training ground for Queensland militia until 1918.

With the focus of Australian northern defence having shifted to Port Darwin, most of the garrison was withdrawn in 1926. In 1932 the Thursday Island defences were dismantled. The remaining defence structures on Green Hill and Milman Hill were neglected until the outbreak of World War II. From 1942 to 1945 Thursday Island served as the headquarters for allied military operations in the Torres Strait. The civilian population was evacuated and Green Hill Fort was used as a signals and wireless station and ammunition store for Australian and American forces. The fortifications were strengthened with several anti-aircraft batteries.

Green Hill Fort has served no military purpose since World War II, but in 1954 the Bureau of Meteorology established a weather station inside the fort which operated until 1993 as part of a national weather reporting system.

The Commonwealth provided a Centenary of Federation grant of $572,000, and additional funding of $124,000 was raised to conserve and restore the fort. The project was completed in April 2002.

Green Hill Fort is now owned by the Torres Strait Regional Authority, an independent agency within the portfolio for Indigenous Affairs, which reports directly to the Commonwealth Minister for Families, Community Services and Indigenous Affairs. The Torres Strait Historical Society and Museum Association is responsible for management of the site.

== Description ==
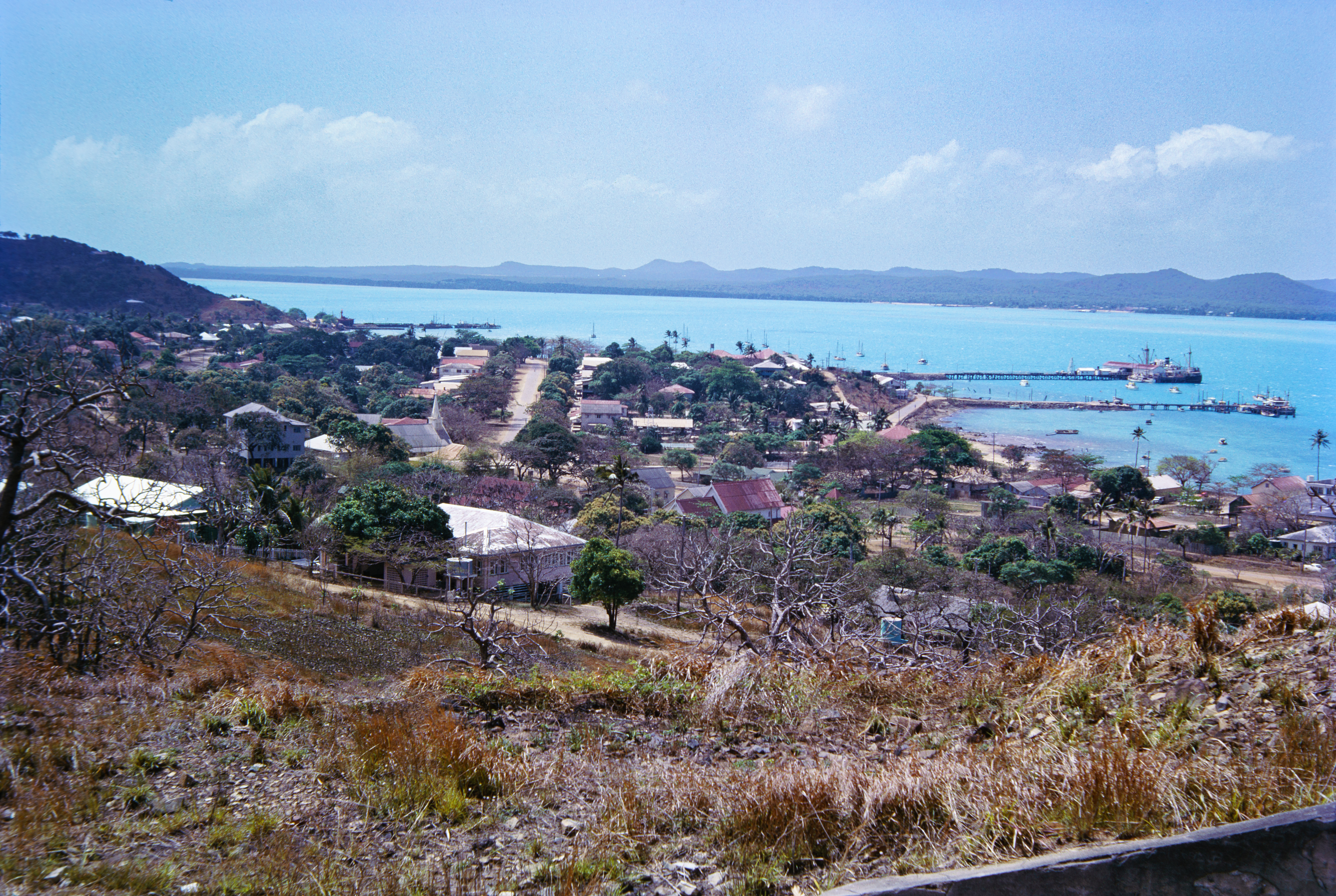
View of Thursday Island from Green Hill Fort, 1964

Green Hill Fort is at about 16ha, 1.5 km west-south-west of Thursday Island town, comprising all of Lot 9 SP133779, including all structures and formations associated with the fortifications at the summit of Green Hill.

Green Hill Fort complex is situated on the western end of the high ridge that forms the east-west spine of Thursday Island. It comprises three principal areas: the fortifications at the western end of the ridge and the surrounding landscape; a small, densely forested saddle between two small knolls in the ridge to the east of the fortifications; and further east still the former barracks site and surrounding landscape. The complex is accessible by an unsealed track off Summers Street, and by a sealed road off Chester Street.

=== The fortifications ===
The battery, located on the top of Green Hill, offers a panoramic view of 270º over Thursday Island harbour and Horn Island to the south, the boat channel and Prince of Wales Island to the southwest, Friday and Goode Islands and the passages to the west, and north over the Aplin Pass boat channel and Hammond Island.

The principal elements of the fortifications include the embankments and terreplein on which the battery is constructed, three external gun emplacements, with working platforms sunk behind protective abutment walls, and associated structures including the sunken observation pit and access walkway. There are three six-inch breech-loading guns. Tunnels and a track for munitions trolleys serviced the gun emplacements.

The centrally-located magazines, storage rooms, passages and associated steps, trolley tracks and entry paths are underground. The main rooms comprise a cordite store, artillery store, shell store, powder magazine, lamp store, machinery room and store.

The 1950s weather station structures, small timber and fibrous cement buildings, included a main office, balloon shed, masts and toilet. The office was removed in 1999.

A partly sealed road leads to the battery and the ridge drops steeply on three sides from the top of the hill.

A telecommunications facility is located in the middle of the reserve to the east of the fortifications. This site is on a separate lot and is not included in the listing boundary for the Green Hill Fort complex.

=== The forested saddle and knolls ===
The dense forest area on the ridge has long been associated with the townscape on Thursday Island. The forest area comprises a distinct mix of indigenous wet tropical forest trees and exotic species, planted or self-sown, evidence of the complex layers of human occupation of the island.

A small cleared area at the western extent of the forest may be associated with the Kaurareg people or with late 19th century Chinese market gardening. There is also a quarry site within this area.

A road from Summers Street connecting the barracks site to the fort has been cut through the forest.

=== The barracks site ===
Surviving elements of the barracks include the remains of the water storage tanks, walls, footings and concrete drains. There are some remnants of exotic trees from early plantings, in particular the mango, in the barracks grounds.

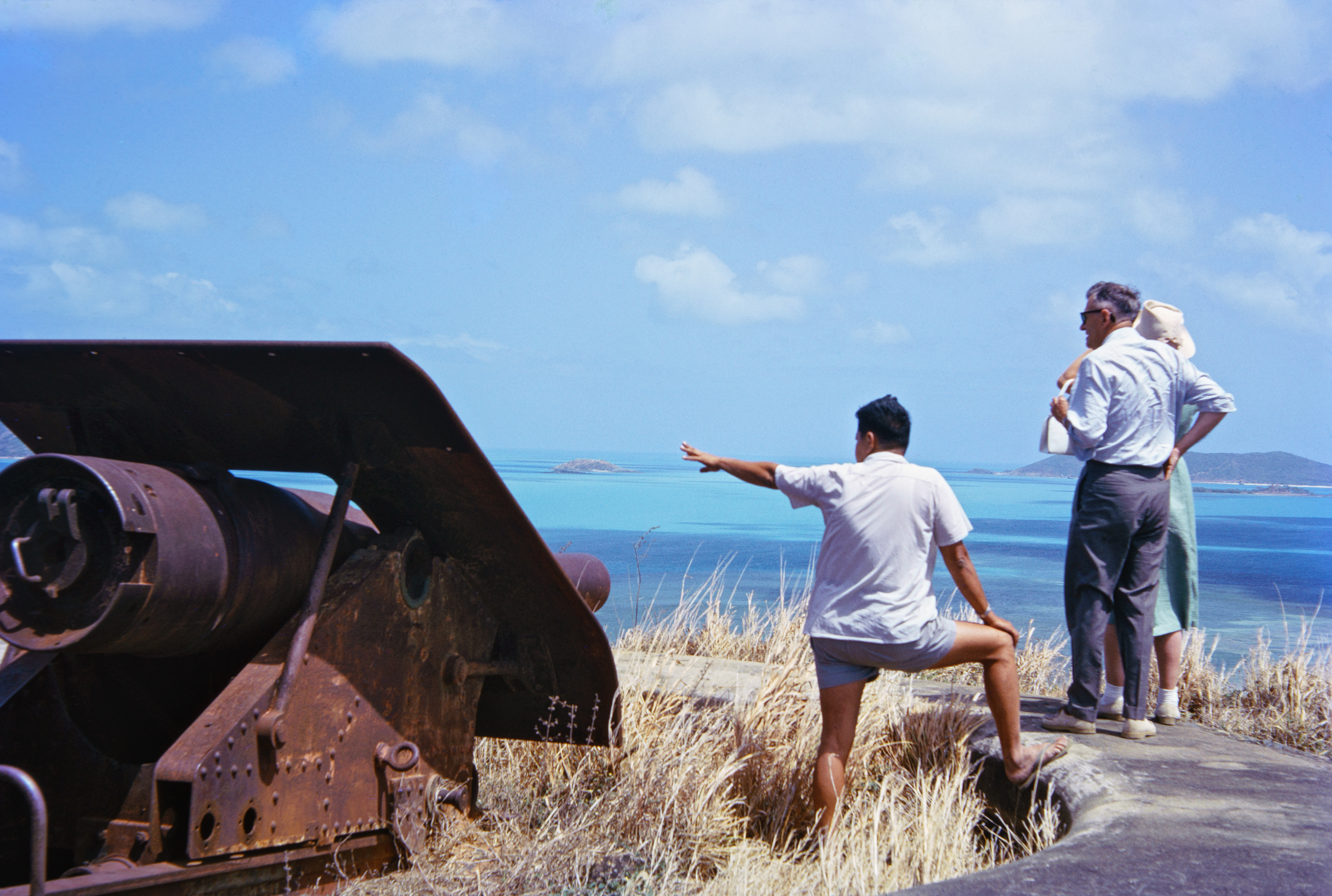
Green Hill Fort, 1964

=== Condition ===
The fort itself remains in structurally sound condition and is essentially intact.

A conservation and restoration project completed in 2002, funded by a Centenary of Federation grant, undertook work on the three 6-inch BL guns and broke out the artillery room door, which had been concreted in, and fitted a suitable timber door. Two external drain sumps were reopened and drainage problems in the magazine area rectified.

The south-eastern ramparts had been affected by erosion and the erection of the timber and fibro Bureau of Meteorology office in the 1950s. The office was considered to have a severe impact on the view of the fort and had been removed in 1999 after being severely vandalised. Concrete slabs, posts and a septic trench associated with the Bureau of Meteorology station were removed during the grant project. Reinstatement of the ramparts was considered a major task and difficult to maintain, and a low heritage and visual impact public viewing area was constructed on the site of the weather station. Minimal repairs to rampart walls were undertaken in other parts of the fort.

Power lines which had a serious impact on the heritage values of the site were relocated to the saddle north of the fort; internal power was upgraded, mains water provided, and telephone lines to the fort re-sited, all via a trench.

Architectural upgrades to doors and sash windows, and installation of ventilation fans and a toilet were undertaken to meet the requirements for visitor facilities.

Landfill and turf was introduced to assist with erosion control.

== Heritage listing ==
Green Hill Fort was listed on the Australian Commonwealth Heritage List on 28 May 2008 having satisfied the following criteria.

Criterion A: Processes

Green Hill Fort is important in Australian military history as a strategic coastal defence installation in the period of transition from British to Australian responsibility for defence. The three 6-inch BL gun emplacements on their sunken working platforms behind protective abutment walls, and associated structures are an intact example of 19th century military fortifications developed when the Australian colonies were assuming responsibility for national defence. As such they are an important part of Australia's military history. There has been little subsequent alteration to the fabric of the fort, and this facilitates an appreciation of the work of Jervois, Scratchley and Druit, and its importance in Australian military history.

Criterion B: Rarity

Green Hill Fort is significant as an uncommon instance of Colonial cooperation in national defence. A number of coastal forts were built in Australia during the second half of the 19th century and early 20th century. However, Green Hill Fort, is one of only two forts where all Colonies agreed to fund construction. The 1885 confrontation between Britain and Russia galvanised the Australian colonies to jointly fund construction of fortifications at Green Hill Fort, and these represent an important and uncommon episode of pre-Federation Colonial cooperation on defence in the "national" interest.

Criterion D: Characteristic values

A number of coastal forts were built in the second half of the 19th century and early 20th century and these forts share the characteristics of typical late 19th century British fortifications established at colonial outposts. The design and layout at Green Hill Fort followed the general design, but unlike other coastal fortification no major adaptations have occurred to the fortifications or other structures in response to changing military technology. As a result the place has a predominantly intact array of representative 19th century features, including embankments and a terreplein on which the gun batteries were mounted. There were also external gun emplacements, with working platforms sunk behind protective abutment walls, together with associated structures including sunken observation bunkers, tunnels and tracks for the munitions trolleys that serviced the gun emplacements. Green Hill Fort is an important example of the characteristics of 19th century Australian defence fortifications.

Criterion H: Significant people

Green Hill Fort has significant heritage value for its associations with Colonel Sir W F D Jervois and Lieutenant-Colonel Peter H Scratchley, whose reports to colonial governments formed the basis of defence planning in Australia from the late 19th century, and with Major Druitt RE of the Queensland Permanent Artillery who was in charge of the works at Green Hill Fort.
