= Shelly Beach, Queensland (Townsville) =

Shelly Beach
- Suburb
- Interactive map of Shelly Beach
- Coordinates: 19.1838°S 146.7513°E
- Country: Australia
- State: Queensland
- City: Townsville
- LGA: City of Townsville
- Location: 11.3 km (7.0 mi) NNW of Townsville CBD; 1,341 km (833 mi) NNW of Brisbane

Government
  - State electorate: Townsville
  - Federal division: Herbert

Area
  - Total: 1.4 km^{2} (0.54 sq mi)

Population
  - Total: 0 (2021 census)
  - Density: 0.0/km^{2} (0.0/sq mi)
- Time zone: UTC+10:00 (AEST)
- Postcode: 4810
Suburbs around Shelly Beach
| Coral Sea | Coral Sea | Coral Sea |
| Town Common | Shelly Beach | Coral Sea |
| Town Common | Pallarenda | Pallarenda |

Shelly Beach is a coastal suburb of Townsville in the City of Townsville, Queensland, Australia. In the 2021 census, Shelly Beach had "no people or a very low population".

== Geography ==
As its name suggests, Shelly Beach is a coastal area with a sandy beach. It was named because it was an area used to collect shell grit. Despite being a suburb, it is undeveloped land within the Townsville Town Common Conservation Park with no road access other than tracks.

== History ==
The suburb's name derives from the shell grit along the sea shore.

== Demographics ==
In the 2016 census, Shelly Beach had "no people or a very low population".

In the 2021 census, Shelly Beach had "no people or a very low population".
