= Cape Pallarenda Conservation Park =

Protected area in Queensland, Australia

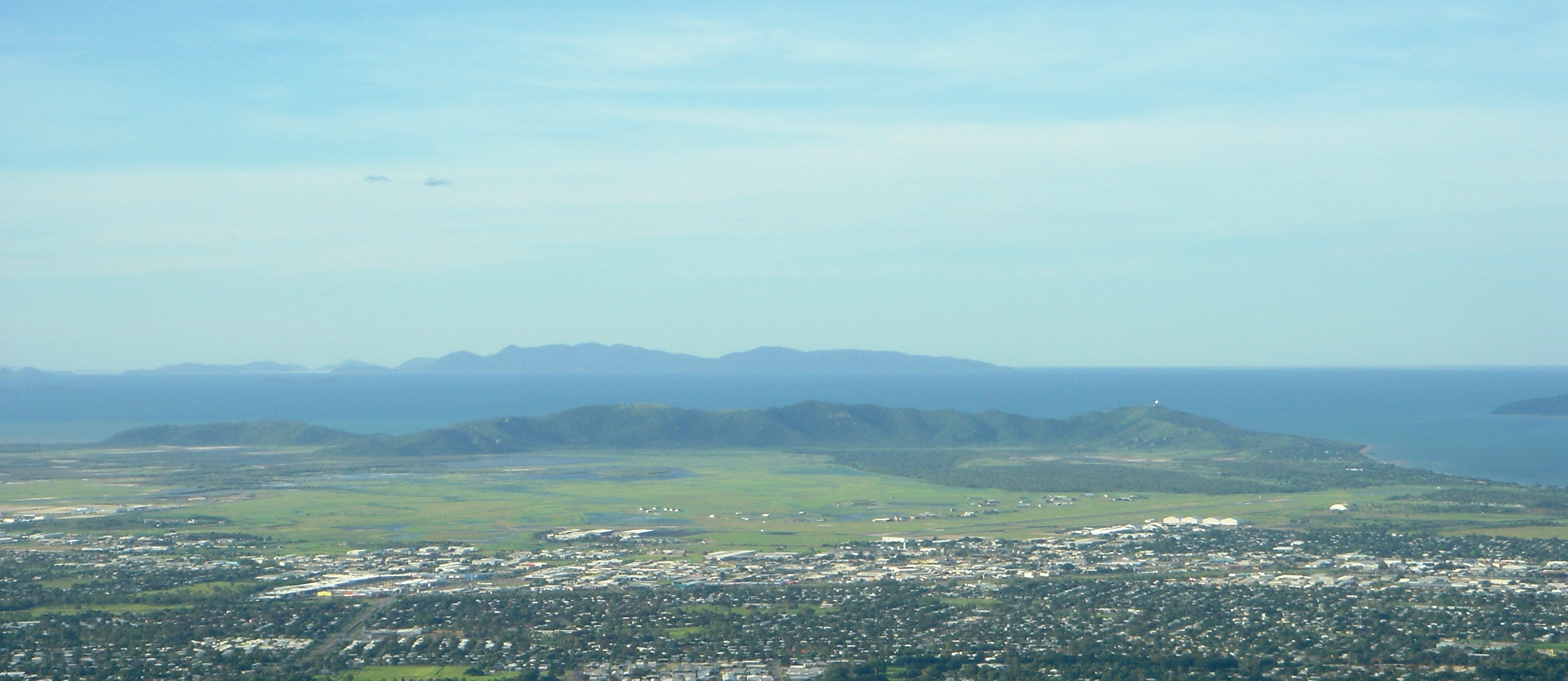
- View of Cape Pallarenda Conservation Park, with parts of the Townsville Airport and RAAF Base Townsville visible in the foreground

- Location within Queensland
- Location: Queensland
- Nearest city: Townsville
- Coordinates: 19°11′30″S 146°46′14″E
- Area: 0.44 km^{2} (0.17 sq mi)
- Established: 1994
- Governing body: Queensland Parks and Wildlife Service
- Website: http://www.nprsr.qld.gov.au/parks/cape-pallarenda/

The Cape Pallarenda Conservation Park is a protected conservation park located 10 kilometres (6.2 mi) north-east of Townsville in the Far North region of Queensland, Australia. The 44-hectare (110-acre) regional park is located within the suburb of Pallarenda.

== Attractions ==
There are several walking tracks on Cape Pallarenda. One of them passes two Second World War searchlight emplacements, and leads to the isolated and scenic Shelley Beach. Another path leads to a moving graveyard and memorial for 13 Vietnamese immigrants who died in August 1920 during a meningitis outbreak while interned at the former Cape Pallarenda Quarantine Station.

Pallarenda Park also has a boat ramp that provides direct access to the beach, and a permanent stinger enclosure for swimming.

== History ==
Cape Pallarenda was named in 1864 by Lieutenant George Poynter Heath during his survey of Cleveland Bay. It is believed that the name is of Aboriginal origin, although the exact meaning is not known.

Pallarenda Park was transformed during World War II into a military hospital. The 500 bed, 2/14 Army General Hospital scattered along the sandy foreshore at Pallarenda received many casualties, most from New Guinea.

== Controversy ==
Consideration is being given to a housing development within the park boundaries, which has been met by opposition by local residents.

== See also ==
- Protected areas of Queensland
