= Cape Pallarenda Quarantine Station =

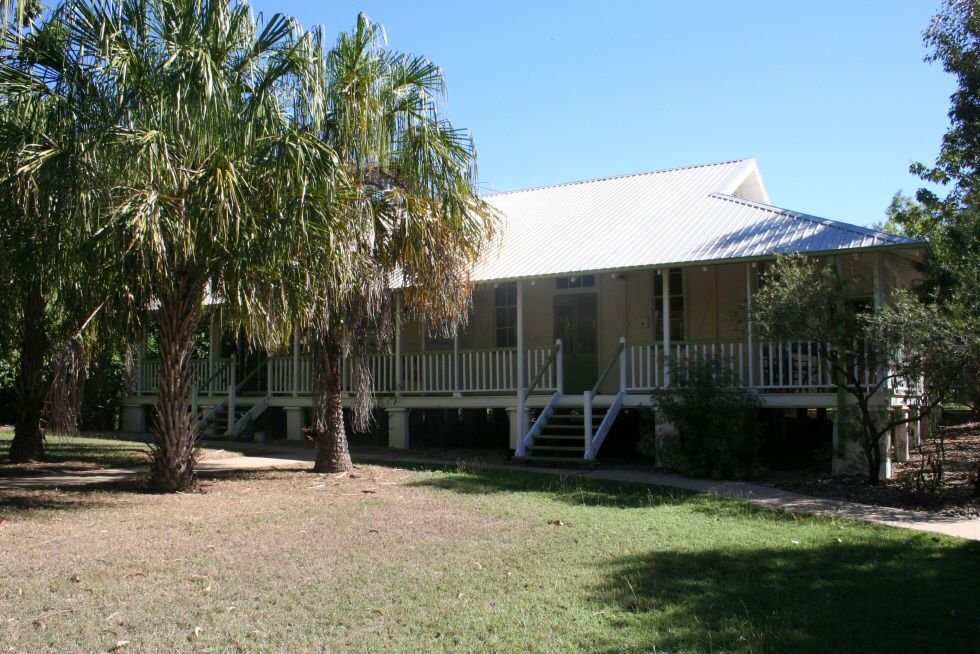
- Cape Pallarenda Quarantine Station

- Location within Queensland Location within Australia
- 19.1917°S 146.7703°E
- Location: 1 The Esplanade, Pallarenda, City of Townsville, Queensland, Australia

History
- Built: 1915–1916

Queensland Heritage Register
- Official name: Cape Pallarenda Quarantine Station (former), Northern Regional Office, Department of Environment and Resource Management, Northern Regional Office, Environmental Protection Agency, Cape Pallarenda Coastal Battery
- Type: state heritage (archaeological, built)
- Designated: 23 April 1999
- Reference no.: 602133
- Significant period: 1884–1885, 1915–1916, c. 1942, 1973 (fabric); 1910s–1970s (historical)
- Significant components: wall/s, cemetery, dining room, jetty/pier, laundry / wash house, disinfecting room, kitchen/kitchen house, shed – storage, gun emplacement, kerbing and channelling, searchlight emplacement, office/administration building, residential accommodation – quarters, bridge – foot/pedestrian, command post, weir, steps/stairway, shower block, slab/s – concrete, drainage, residential accommodation – manager's house/quarters, camouflage net securing points

Cape Pallarenda Quarantine Station is a heritage-listed former quarantine station at 1 The Esplanade, Pallarenda, City of Townsville, Queensland, Australia. It was built from 1915 to 1916. It is also known as Northern Regional Office, Department of Environment and Resource Management, Northern Regional Office, Environmental Protection Agency, and Cape Pallarenda Coastal Battery. It was added to the Queensland Heritage Register on 23 April 1999. The site is part of Cape Pallarenda Conservation Park.

== History ==
The former Quarantine Station at Cape Pallarenda was established between 1915 and 1916, using building materials previously used in the construction of an earlier quarantine station constructed in 1884–1885 at West Point, Magnetic Island.

The concept of isolating those parts of the community suffering from disease dates to 14th century Italy, when Venice, trying to protect the city from ship-born disease, established a segregated area away from the centre of population. These isolation areas became known as quarantine stations, from the Latin words for forty days after which time patients, if they were not dead were considered clear of disease.

Quarantine in the northern part of Australia began when the Moreton Bay District of New South Wales (later part of Queensland), established a quarantine station at Dunwich on Stradbroke Island in July 1849 after deaths were recorded on a ship arriving at Moreton Bay in January 1849. The introduction of disease into Northern Australia became an issue as the population of Australia increased after the discovery of gold in 1851, and in Queensland after the opening of a gold field at Crocodile Creek in Central Queensland in 1866. In 1867 the population expanded as a result of a rush of 15,000 diggers to new gold fields at Gympie, Central Queensland and Cape River, North Queensland.

This growth of population and the development of Australia as a sea trading nation made it obvious that there was a need to control the introduction and spread of infectious diseases. The first Queensland Health Act was drafted in 1884; the other Australian colonies had drawn up laws by the late 1890s. In general, legislation established Central Boards of Health to enforce notification of infectious diseases and to provide guidelines for quarantining suspected cases.

Townsville, the first or second port of call for shipping on the Asia/Pacific route, was identified as a place where suspected cases of ship-born disease could be detained. In 1875 Magnetic Island, just off Townsville, was set aside as a place of quarantine. Tents were set up at Picnic Bay, with passengers cared for by the Butler family, who had recently established pineapple plantations on the Island. The Butlers later built primitive huts at either end of the beach for male and female emigrants. A number of people died at Picnic Bay and are buried at the eastern end of the Bay.

In 1884 a permanent quarantine station was established at West Point, Magnetic Island, in response to the provisions of the Queensland Health Act and as a result of community concern about the standard of accommodation for people quarantined on the island. Colonial Architect John James Clark prepared drawings for five buildings in 1883. Tenders were called on 9 October 1884 and the West Point site was gazetted as an area for quarantine in March 1885.

Townsville builders, Lesser and Soarre, won the contract and work commenced in November 1884. By mid-1885 the hospital, single women's quarters, married quarters, single men's quarters, and a store had been constructed at a cost of £3,765. In early 1886 Townsville firm Cavell & Holt won the tender to construct a caretaker's cottage at a cost of £305. Between December 1885 and 1887 a jetty, Surgeon's Quarters, wash houses, and fencing were constructed by C & A Sparre at a cost of £11,005. In 1887, EJ Cavell built a luggage shed at a cost of £116.

By 1909, when responsibility for the Quarantine Service had passed to the Commonwealth, the Port of Townsville had developed into the second busiest port in Queensland with special ferry facilities needed to transport quarantine cases to West Point.

The West Point location had not proved to be an ideal one for a quarantine station. Lack of water, distance from the port, and distance from medical authorities caused difficulties. An increased interest in the study of tropical diseases after the establishment by the Commonwealth Health Department of the Tropical Institute Research Project in the General Hospital grounds in 1911, also led to a re-evaluation of the location of the quarantine station.

A site was set aside at Cape Marlow (later Cape Pallarenda), for a mainland quarantine station in 1910, but it was not until 1914, with the threat of increased disease after the outbreak of World War 1, that planning began in earnest to move the West Point buildings to the mainland.

Tenders, which were called in July 1914, were rejected as too high. Reviewing the proposal, the Director General of Works under the direction of the Minister for Home Affairs, decided the project should be carried out as an Employment Enhancement Scheme. The cost of the project, built by day labour, was set at £12,400 and reassessed in 1917 at £15,538.

The Cape Pallarenda site was cleared and a road cut across the town common to German Gardens (now known as Belgian Gardens). The Director of Quarantine approved the transfer of "buildings from Magnetic Island to the Cape Pallarenda site, some new buildings to be erected", in April 1913.

Removal took 7 months from November 1915 to June 1916. The large buildings were unroofed, dismantled into wall and ceiling panels and the floors separated into scantlings. The materials were loaded onto a barge for transfer to the jetty at Cape Pallarenda. The buildings were re-erected according to drawings supplied by the Government architect for the Department of Home Affairs.

On the new site the buildings received new roofs, had verandah handrails added, and the window details were changed. New buildings were constructed for the Administration Block (present Marine Parks Building), the Bath Block, the Asiatic Shelter Shed, the Laundry (Wet Tropics Volunteers Building), Incinerator Shed, and Disinfecting Block (present museum Building). The layout of the complex was detailed in a site drawing by CMU Todd, Works Director for Queensland, in 1916.

Living facilities at the quarantine station were divided by the same class system that existed in ships. There were separate dining and living facilities for first and second class passengers and a segregated area near the fumigation shed for Asiatic seamen and passengers. The Asiatic area was a covered concrete slab where hammocks were suspended under a canopy.

The complex was linked by a series of footpaths and a service road system. A well was sunk in the sand dunes above high water mark and a series of water mains were connected throughout. The beach front well was never entirely satisfactory and a small earthen weir was constructed in the creek behind the jetty. This weir never held water and in 1925 a second, small concrete dam was constructed on the slope of Many Peaks Range at the rear of the Station. This weir was constructed by A Jensen and cost £1284.

The quarantine station continued to accept quarantined passengers from ships travelling the Asian shipping routes well into the twentieth century. There was a good deal of activity, particularly during the flu epidemic of 1919 and the bubonic plague pandemic of the early part of the twentieth century. In August 1920, 13 Vietnamese sailors died of meningitis and were buried behind the hospital.

By 1942 Townsville had become the supply base for World War II in the South-West Pacific. Australian Area Combined Headquarters for the North-east Area was established in Townsville as well as the United States Army Base Section Two, the Fourth Air Depot of the United States Army/Airforce, a naval replenishment port and a major transhipment centre for troops and supplies. Townsville was heavily defended with radar, searchlights and anti-aircraft installations. Fixed coastal defence installations were constructed on Mount Marlow at Pallarenda and on Magnetic Island.

The facility at Pallarenda was designed to protect the northern entrance to Townsville Harbour and to protect the shipping passage between the mainland and Magnetic Island. The construction at Pallarenda included two gun emplacements, two searchlight installations, a command post and a sizeable camp. The complex was probably constructed by the Main Roads Department under direction from the Allied Works Council, which was the principal construction authority in Queensland for wartime installations such as roads, airstrips and coastal defence fortifications.

The Station continued to function throughout World War II and up until the Malayan War when, between 1966 and 1974, the Hospital and Observance Block were taken over by the 9th Field Ambulance Corp Field Hospital.

A new hospital building was constructed in 1973, mainly to treat contagious patients returning from the Vietnam War. The Hospital and Observation Block, built of material from the West Point site, were damaged during Cyclone Althea in December 1971 and demolished to make way for the new building. Although completed, the hospital was never used as a medical facility because of the construction of a contagious diseases hospital in Melbourne which accepted cases from all over Australia. The hospital was used as 4 Camp hospital by the Australian Army base at nearby Lavarack as a place for injured soldiers to recuperate after surgery etc. and was staffed by a doctor and several nurses, a cook, quartermaster, storeman, transport NCO and drivers for a period of time in the early 1970s.

The construction of the Melbourne Contagious Disease Hospital marked the end of the Pallarenda facility as a place of quarantine. Planning to locate the recently established Australian Institute of Marine Science (AIMS) into the complex began early in 1974. By November 1974 AIMS personnel had moved into six transportable laboratories and the former Quarantine Station buildings. AIMS remained until 1977 when the organisation moved to a permanent location at Cape Ferguson, south of Townsville.

The Great Barrier Reef Marine Park Authority (GRBRMPA) was located in the present Marine Parks building for a short time, soon after it was established in 1975. However, after AIMS and GRBRMPA moved out, the complex remained empty until 1 February 1986 when the area was gazetted as an Environmental Park.

The grounds of the former quarantine station were planted with native vegetation and the former Administration building occupied by the Marine Parks Section of the Queensland Department of Environment and Heritage. The rest of the buildings were restored in 1991–1992 and occupied by the Northern Regional Office of the then Environmental Protection Agency.

== Description ==
The former quarantine station is located at Cape Pallarenda on a rise behind coastal sand dunes. Mount Marlow rises from a small flood plain at the rear of the complex.

There are sixteen timber buildings within the heritage register boundary, some of which were constructed at West Point and later moved and re-assembled at Cape Pallarenda. The buildings are set within a green rainforest setting which contributes to the tropical ambience of the site. The buildings are timber framed and clad with vertical chamfered timber boards. The buildings are supported on concrete stumps.

The buildings that form part of the quarantine station include a central group:

- Marine Parks/Coastal Management (former Administration/Doctors Building)
- Conference Room/Planning Section (former First Class Quarters)
- Reception/Library/Records/RDs office (former Second Class Quarters)
- QNPWS/Conservation Strategy/Resources (former Dining Room)
- Graphics Lab (former Kitchen)
- Wetlands/GIS Mapping (former Married Quarters)
- Administration/Accounts (former Engine Drivers Accommodation)

To the south of this group is the Cultural Heritage/Engineering (former Manager's Residence). To the northern of the central group are the:

- Habitat Hut (former Storage Shed)
- Workshop (former Laundry)
- Museum (former Disinfectant Block)
- Storage Shed (former Shower Block)

The roofs of the buildings are generally half hipped with ventilation panels in the small gable ends formed by the half hip. The roofs are clad with a mixture of corrugated iron sheeting and aluminium decking. The roofs in many cases extend over generous verandahs and are supported on stop chamfered columns. Between the timber columns are simple timber battened balustrades. The stairs which provide access to the buildings are generally open tread timber stairs with simple timber rail balustrade.

The buildings feature double French doors opening onto the verandah spaces with operable transom windows above. Lining the original faces of the buildings are vertical sash timber framed windows. The former Manager's Residence features remnant interiors which are earlier than the other buildings of the complex.

The former First Class Quarters and Second Class Quarters were originally two halves of the nineteenth century West Point Hospital Building, a large timber building with surrounding verandahs built on the pavilion planning principles. The former Married Quarters was originally the Hospital Kitchen, also moved from West Point. Another building from the West Point Quarantine Station site is the former Dining Room which was built as the single women's quarters. The central original dining room has been divided into several offices internally.

The former administration block dates from 1915, and has a long east west axis comprising a core of offices arranged around a central hall with verandahs surrounding the building, measuring 2.7 metres (8 ft 10 in) in width. The building is elevated on concrete stumps and has a low half hipped roof.

A number of associated structures are found throughout the site defined by the heritage register boundary. These include World War II fortifications and various water structures.

The World War II fortifications are located on the lower slopes of Mount Marlow, to the north west of the former quarantine station buildings at Pallarenda. The facilities are built on the rocky slopes with the command post on the highest point. There are five structures still surviving as well as concrete slabs in the accommodation area, drainage systems along the paths and a substantial piece of curbing and guttering along the track to the gun emplacements. Other visible evidence includes a large hole in rock with a remnant camouflage frame over it, a levelled area below the command post which is surrounded by a stone pitched wall and steps.

The command post is a concrete building which comprises two rooms, one above the other, with observation slits cut at head height round three sides of the structure. Access to the building is from the northern side into the lower room and from the rear into the higher room. The gun emplacements are also built of concrete. The guns were protected by a cantilevered extension, with a shell store and cartridge store of reinforced concrete at the rear. Searchlight facilities are of similar construction without the rear store rooms. The road drainage system and curbing and guttering are of rock lined channels held in place with concrete. The level area below the command post is surrounded by a stone-pitched wall with concrete and stone steps. There is some evidence that the buildings were covered in camouflage paint. Some sections of the buildings have been painted in recent years in an attempt to cover graffiti.

On the bank of a creek which runs beside the quarantine station is a concrete weir which was apparently built to supply water. The remnants of a stone jetty is sited near where this creek flows to the sea. An early timber footbridge provides carriage across the creek.

== Heritage listing ==
The former Cape Pallarenda Quarantine Station was listed on the Queensland Heritage Register on 23 April 1999 having satisfied the following criteria.

The place is important in demonstrating the evolution or pattern of Queensland's history.

The site demonstrates government and community attempts to eradicate and treat tropical disease and effect racial segregation at the turn of the century.

The complex has historic links with seaborn immigration and early settlement of Townsville and North Queensland and with the development of Townsville as a port. These links extend to the various wars with which Australia has been involved and to the foundation of the Australian Institute of Marine Science, the Great Barrier Reef Marine Park Authority and to the establishment of the Department of Environment and Heritage.

The place demonstrates rare, uncommon or endangered aspects of Queensland's cultural heritage.

The former Cape Pallarenda Quarantine Station was constructed in 1915/16, under an Employment Enhancement Scheme and is one of few surviving early quarantine stations in Australia and the only substantially intact example in North Queensland.

The place is important in demonstrating the principal characteristics of a particular class of cultural places.

The site comprises a coherent group of early 20th century timber buildings constructed for the Federal government and includes building elements from the 19th century quarantine station at West Point, Magnetic Island.

The place has a special association with the life or work of a particular person, group or organisation of importance in Queensland's history.

These links extend to the various wars with which Australia has been involved and to the foundation of the Australian Institute of Marine Science, the Great Barrier Reef Marine Park Authority and to the establishment of the Department of Environment and Heritage.
