= Pallarenda, Queensland =

Suburb of Townsville, Queensland, Australia

Pallarenda Townsville, Queensland
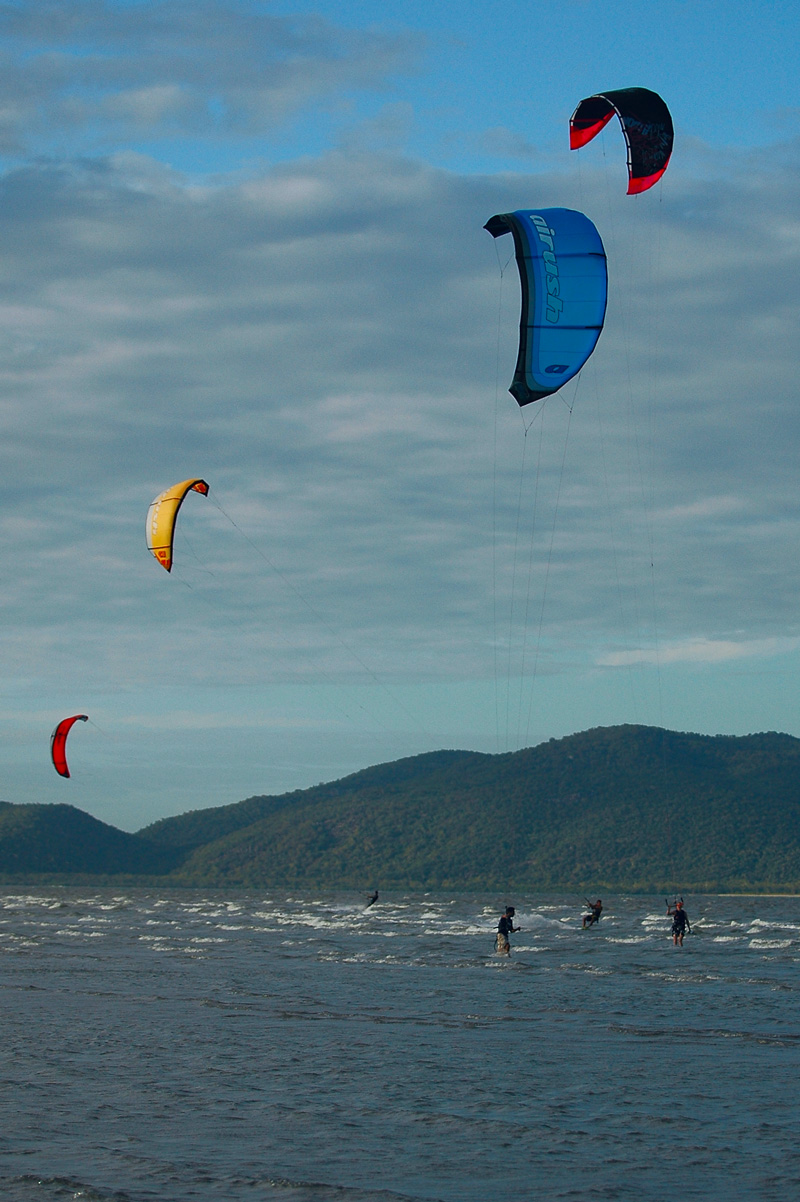
- Kite surfing off Pallarenda beach

- Coordinates: 19.2005°S 146.7677°E
- Population: 778 (2021 census)
  - Density: 299/km^{2} (775/sq mi)
- Postcode(s): 4810
- Area: 2.6 km^{2} (1.0 sq mi)
- Time zone: AEST (UTC+10:00)
- Location: 8.7 km (5 mi) NNW of Townsville CBD; 1,360 km (845 mi) NNW of Brisbane
- LGA(s): City of Townsville
- State electorate(s): Townsville
- Federal division(s): Herbert
Suburbs around Pallarenda:
Shelly Beach	Shelly Beach	Coral Sea
Town Common	Pallarenda	Coral Sea
Town Common	Town Common	Coral Sea

Pallarenda is a northern coastal suburb of Townsville in the City of Townsville, Queensland, Australia. In the 2021 census, Pallarenda had a population of 778 people.

== Geography ==
The locality is bounded to the east by Cleveland Bay, a side bay of the Coral Sea, with Cape Pallarenda at the northern end of its coastline (19.1888°S 146.7738°E).

The residential development in the suburb is only three streets deep from the beach and is surrounded by undeveloped land. It is accessed by the Cape Pallarenda Road which runs north along the coast from Rowes Bay. In the north of Pallarenda is the Cape Pallarenda Conservation Park.

== History ==
The former Quarantine Station at Cape Pallarenda was established between 1915 and 1916, using building materials previously used in the construction of an earlier quarantine station constructed in 1884–1885 at West Point, Magnetic Island.

During World War II, Townsville was a major military staging point for fighting in the war in the South West Pacific against the Japanese. There were two coastal artillery batteries in Pallarenda:

- Cape Pallarenda Coastal Battery (19.18944°S 146.77374°E)
- Three Mile Creek Anti Aircraft Battery (19.21978°S 146.77602°E)

The area was attacked early in the morning of 27 July 1942 during a Japanese air raid on Townsville.

The suburb was officially named and bounded on 12 June 1992. It is believed the name Pallarenda was given by naval officer George Poynter Heath in 1864, possibly from castaway James Morrill who lived with local Aboriginal people.

== Demographics ==
In the 2016 census, Pallarenda had a population of 791 people.

In the 2021 census, Pallarenda had a population of 778 people.

== Heritage listings ==
Pallarenda has a number of sites on the Queensland Heritage Register, including:

- Cape Pallarenda Quarantine Station in the Cape Pallarenda Conservation Park (19.1917°S 146.7703°E)

== Education ==
There are no schools in Pallarenda. The nearest government primary school is Belgian Gardens State School in Belgian Gardens to the south-east. The nearest government secondary school is Townsville State High School in Railway Estate to the south-east.

== Amenities ==
There is a boat ramp on Marlow Street at the northern end of Cape Pallarenda Road (19.1973°S 146.7741°E). It is managed by the Townsville City Council.
