= 2025 Townsville mayoral by-election =

Election in Queensland

- 15 November 2025
- Registered: 142,775
- Turnout: 72.35% (▼6.86)
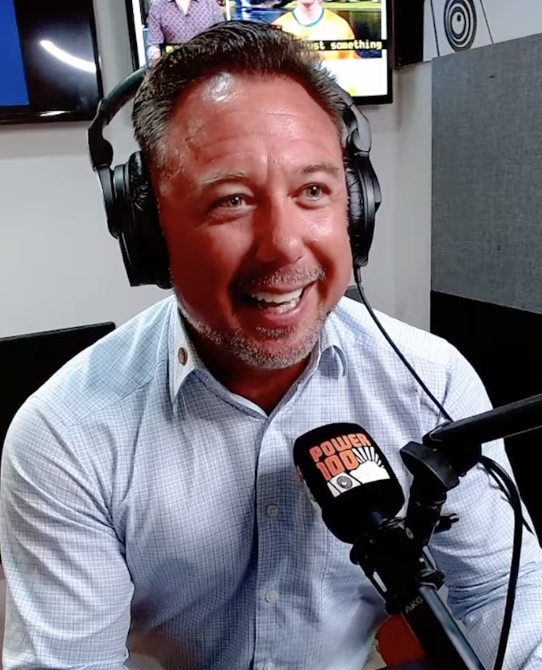
	First party	Second party
		IND
Candidate	Nick Dametto	Ann-Maree Greaney
Party	Independent	Independent
Primary vote	62,896	13,337
Percentage	61.51%	13.04%
Swing	▲61.51	▲13.04
Mayor before election
Troy Thompson
Independent
Elected Mayor
Nick Dametto
Independent

The 2025 Townsville mayoral by-election was held on 15 November 2025 to elect the mayor of Townsville in Queensland, following the resignation of incumbent mayor Troy Thompson. Thompson, who was suspended from the mayoralty by the Queensland Government in November 2024, recontested the position at the by-election.

Nick Dametto won the by-election with 62.7% of primary votes.

== Background ==
=== 2024 election results ===
2024 Queensland mayoral elections: Townsville
Party	Candidate	Votes	%	±%
Independent	Troy Thompson	50,167	46.60	+46.60
Team Jenny Hill	Jenny Hill	47,415	43.86	−6.78
Independent	Harry Patel	10,529	9.74	+9.74
Total formal votes		108,111	96.51	
Informal votes		3,909	3.49	
Turnout		112,020	79.21	+4.94
Two-candidate-preferred result
Independent	Troy Thompson	53,956	52.62	+52.62
Team Jenny Hill	Jenny Hill	48,575	47.38	−14.15
Independent gain from Team Jenny Hill		Swing	N/A	

== Electoral system ==
At the request of Townsville City Council, the Electoral Commission of Queensland (ECQ) conducted the by-election via post.

== Candidates ==
Candidates are listed in the order they appeared on the ballot.

Party	Candidate	Background
Independent	Sean Gleeson	Former detention centre worker
Independent	Troy Thompson	Mayor of Townsville from 2024 until 2025
Independent	Harry Patel	Candidate for mayor in 2012, 2016 and 2024
Independent	Nick Dametto	Former member for Hinchinbrook in the Queensland Legislative Assembly
Independent	Chris Poulsen	Former Queensland Nickel worker
Independent	Ann-Maree Greaney	Acting mayor since 2024
Independent Labor	Paul Jacob	Councillor for Division 1 since 2024
Independent Labor	Joanne Keune	Founder of SpeakEze Communication Coaching
Independent	David Kippin	Former CEO of Townsville Enterprise

Nick Dametto, who has served as the member for Hinchinbrook in the Queensland Legislative Assembly since 2017, announced on the same day as Thompson's resignation that he would contest the mayoral by-election. Under Queensland law, candidates running for local government positions cannot be a member of a state or federal parliament. Dametto resigned from the Katter's Australian Party (KAP) to contest as an independent, although the KAP endorsed his candidacy.

Ann-Maree Greaney, the councillor for Division 3 since 2016 and the acting mayor since Thompson's suspension in 2024, contested. Former Mundingburra MP Les Walker considered contesting, but ultimately chose not to run.

No political party endorsed candidates at the 2024 mayoral election. The Labor Party (ALP) has not made endorsements for Townsville local elections since 2008, although Labor members Paul Jacob and Joanne Keune contested the by-election without the party's endorsement. David Cassells, the secretary of the ALP's Herbert Federal Organising Committee, supported voting for either Jacob or Keune, as well as putting Thompson last and Dametto second last.

== Campaign ==
On 27 October 2025, the Townsville Bulletin reported that Sean Gleeson had previously replied to a Reddit post in the "r/Rape_Hentai" subreddit. The following day, he withdrew from the by-election citing "mental health reasons".

During the final week of campaigning, Joanne Keune recruited a lost international tourist to hold her campaign signage in exchange for a ride back to his cruise ship. Keune was subsequently criticised by several other mayoral candidates.

== Debates and forums ==
P	Participant
W	Withdrew

=== List of debates and forums ===
Date	Host	Participants								
Date	Host	Gle.	Tho.	Pat.	Dam.	Pou.	Gre.	Jac.	Keu.	Kip.
28 Oct 2025	Townsville Bulletin	W	P	P	P	P	P	P	P	P

== Results ==
2025 Townsville mayoral by-election
Party	Candidate	Votes	%	±%
Independent	Nick Dametto	62,896	61.51	+61.51
Independent	Ann-Maree Greaney	13,337	13.04	+13.04
Independent	David Kippin	7,325	7.16	+7.16
Independent Labor	Joanne Keune	5,415	5.30	+5.30
Independent	Troy Thompson	5,046	4.93	–41.67
Independent Labor	Paul Jacob	2,881	2.82	+2.82
Independent	Harry Patel	2,236	2.19	–7.55
Independent	Chris Poulsen	1,912	1.87	+1.87
Independent	Sean Gleeson (withdrawn)	1,204	1.18	+1.18
Total formal votes		102,252	98.98	+2.47
Informal votes		1,051	1.02	−2.47
Turnout		103,303	72.35	−6.86
Nick Dametto gain from Troy Thompson				

== See also ==
- 2025 Hinchinbrook state by-election
