= 2028 Queensland local elections =

Australian local elections

- 25 March 2028
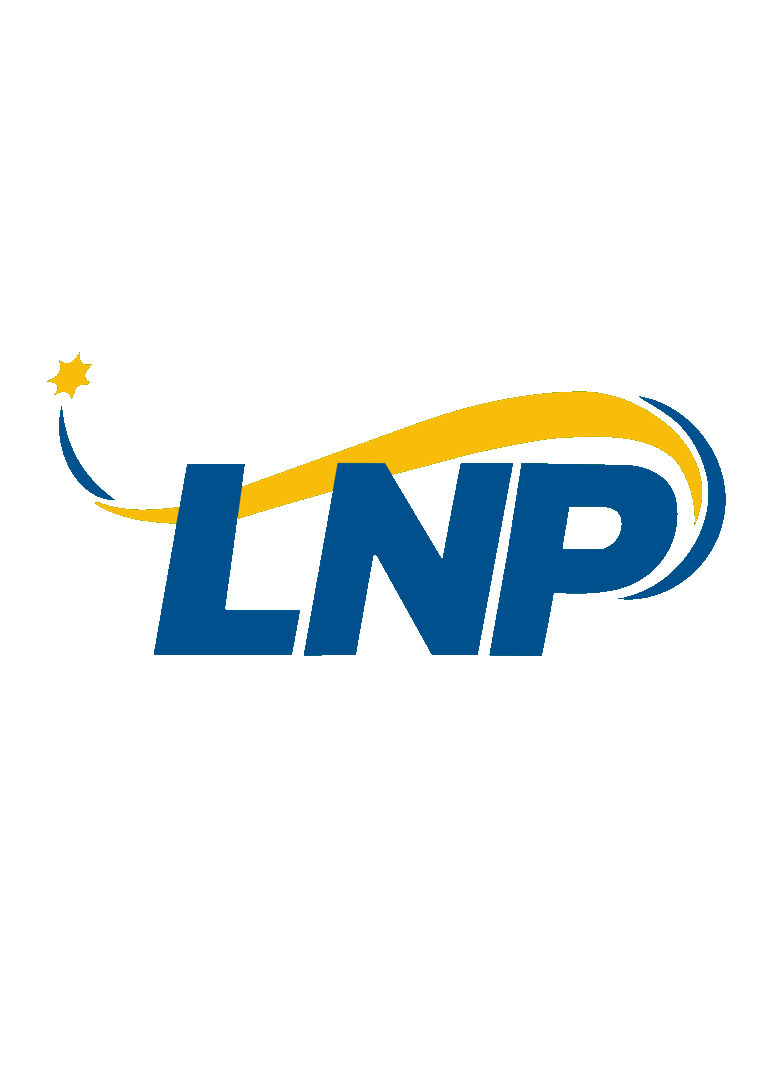

	IND
Party	Independents	Liberal National	Labor
Last election	446 seats	18 seats	5 seats
Current seats	446	18	5
		QS
Party	Greens	Qld Socialists
Last election	2 seats	Did not exist
Current seats	2	1

The 2028 Queensland local elections are scheduled to be held on 25 March 2028 to elect the mayors and councils of the 77 local government areas in Queensland.

== Electoral systems ==
Like at state and federal elections, voting at Queensland local elections is compulsory. The elections are conducted by the Electoral Commission of Queensland (ECQ).

=== Mayors and single-member wards ===
All 77 councils use optional preferential voting (OPV) for mayoral elections. Under this system, voters are only required to vote for one candidates, although they can choose to preference other candidates.

In the 22 councils that use single-member wards (including Brisbane, Gold Coast and Townsville) OPV is also used.

=== Multi-member wards ===
Only Ipswich uses multi-member wards, with four two-member wards (resulting in eight total councillors).

No form of preferential voting is in place, with plurality block voting − also referred to as first-past-the-post by the ECQ − instead used. Voters are only required to mark the same amount of candidates as there are positions to be elected (in the case of Ipswich, two candidates).

=== Undivided councils ===
54 councils are undivided, meaning they do not use any forms of wards and all councillors are elected to a single area representing the entire council.

Plurality block voting is used for these councils.

== Composition changes before elections ==
=== Party changes before elections ===
As of October 2024, two councillors have joined a party before the 2028 elections.

Council	Ward	Councillor	Former party	New party	Date
Cairns	Division 5	Rob Pyne	Ind. Socialist Alliance	Independent Greens	29 April 2024
Logan	Division 8	Jacob Heremaia	Independent	Independent LNP	26 August 2024
Cairns	Division 5	Rob Pyne	Independent Greens	Queensland Socialists	2026

=== Councillor changes before elections ===
Council	Ward	Former party	Former councillor	New party	New councillor	Election date
Moreton Bay	Division 11	Independent	Darren Grimwade	Independent	Ellie Smith	27 September 2025
Townsville	Mayor	Independent	Troy Thompson	Independent	Nick Dametto	15 November 2025

== Political parties ==
Queensland councils are largely non-partisan. Most wards are not contested by political parties and are rarely successful when they do. The sole exception to this is Brisbane, which is contested by the Liberal National Party, Labor and the Greens. These parties are all likely to recontest in 2028. There are also a number of councillors and candidates who are members of political parties but ran as independents.
