= My Place Australia =

Australian conspiracy theorist group

- Formation: 28 November 2022
- Founder: Darren Bergwerf
- Headquarters: Melbourne, Victoria, Australia
- Website: web.myplaceaustralia.org

My Place Australia, also known simply as My Place, is an Australian conspiracy theorist group. The group is based in Melbourne and is active in local government politics across Australia. As of April 2024, My Place had around 180 active Facebook groups.

== History ==
My Place was founded in 2022 by Darren Bergwerf, a former Australia One-endorsed candidate, who contested the 2022 federal election, the 2022 Victorian state election and the 2024 Dunkley by-election for that party. The group plans to establish a society that can defend itself from the "collapse of civilisation".

At the 2024 Queensland local elections, My Place members were active in a number of local government areas, including Bundaberg, Gympie and Sunshine Coast. The local chapter of My Place in Townsville supported mayoral candidate Troy Thompson, who was the successful candidate at the 2024 Townsville City Council election. Thompson publicly thanked the group for their support.

Members of My Place disclosed plans to contest the 2024 New South Wales local elections and 2024 Victorian local elections.

== Ideology ==
My Place Australia is widely regarded as part of the pseudolaw sovereign citizen movement, and promotes anti-government and anti-establishment views. The group has been described as a dystopian cult and a fringe group. It has also been described as a far-right extremist group.

My Place has promoted conspiracy theories about COVID-19, vaccines, 5G technology, chemtrails, fluoride, wind turbines, climate change, renewable energy and "smart cities".

While founder Bergwerf has condemned neo-Nazism, he has stated that he is unsure whether or not the Holocaust actually occurred, his reason being that he "wasn't there [when it happened]".
