= 2020 Townsville City Council election =

← 2016	28 March 2020	2024 →
- Turnout: 74.27% (▼5.78) (mayoral election)
- Mayor
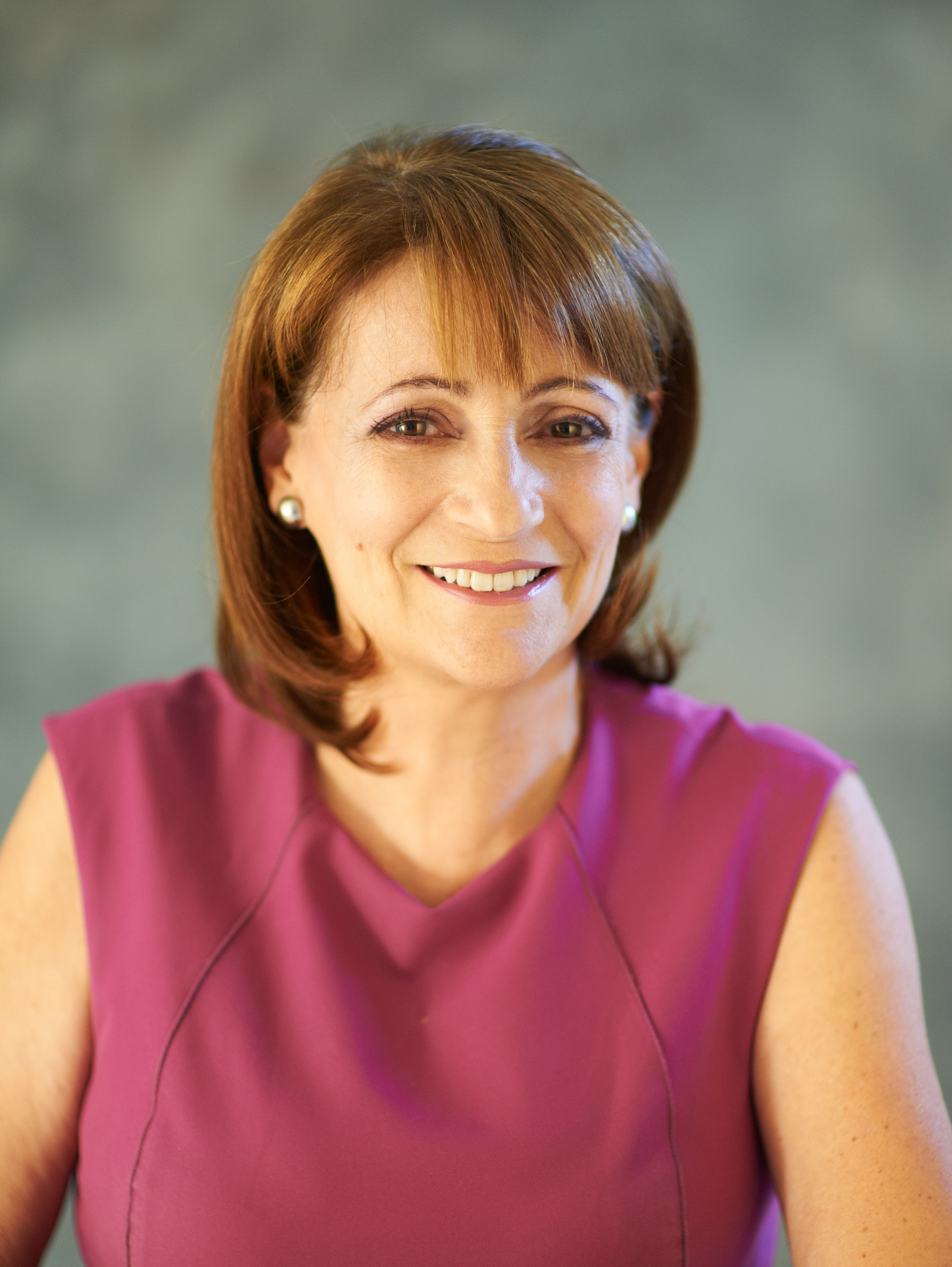
	First party	Second party	Third party
		IND	TFT
Candidate	Jenny Hill	Sam Cox	Greg Dowling
Party	Team Jenny Hill	Independent	Time for Townsville
Popular vote	46,911	25,076	16,155
Percentage	50.64%	27.07%	17.44%
Swing	▼8.87	▲27.07	▲17.44
2CP	61.53%	38.47%
2CP swing	▼1.16	▲38.47
Mayor before election
Jenny Hill
Team Jenny Hill
Subsequent Mayor
Jenny Hill
Team Jenny Hill
- Councillors
- All 11 members on the City Council (including the Mayor); 6 seats needed for a majority
Party	Leader	Vote %	Seats	+/–
Team Jenny Hill	Jenny Hill		9	−1
Independent	N/A		1	+1
This lists parties that won seats. See the complete results below.

The 2020 Townsville City Council election was held on 28 March 2020 to elect a mayor and 10 councillors to the City of Townsville. The election was held as part of the statewide local elections in Queensland, Australia.

Team Jenny Hill won all but one wards, with their only loss coming in Division 2. Hill was also re-elected mayor, winning 61.53% of the vote after preferences.

== Candidates ==
Incumbents are shown in bold text.

Ward	Held by	Team Jenny Hill	Time for Townsville	NQ State Alliance	Independents	Others
Mayor	Team Jenny Hill	**Jenny Hill**	Greg Dowling	Chris Eastaughffe	Sam Cox	
Division 1	Team Jenny Hill	**Margie Ryder**	Nigel Ward	Brigot Pugh	Sandra Chesney	
Division 2	Independent	Nanette Radeck			Sue Blom	
Division 3	Team Jenny Hill	**Ann-Maree Greaney**	Nicole Bates	Alan Sheret		Mackenzie Severns (AJP)
Division 4	Team Jenny Hill	**Mark Molachino**				
Division 5	Team Jenny Hill	**Russ Cook**	Paul Bagenal			
Division 6	Team Jenny Hill	Suzy Batkovic	Martin Brewster	Damon Johnstone	Trevor Roberts	Alan Birrell (Ind. PHON)
Division 7	Team Jenny Hill	**Kurt Rehbein**	Harry Patel			
Division 8	Team Jenny Hill	**Maurie Soars**		Chris Hanson	Stephen Duffie	
Division 9	Team Jenny Hill	Liam Mooney		Jacinta Warland	Corey Davis; Trevor Elson	
Division 10	Team Jenny Hill	**Les Walker**		Fran O'Callaghan	Asti Poole	

Most Team Hill councillors sought re-election. Verena Coombe (Division 6) and Colleen Doyle (Division 9) retired, while Paul Jacob (Division 2) left Team Hill in 2019 to sit as an independent. He did not seek re-election.

Former MP Sam Cox announced in November 2019 that he would run for mayor as an independent, with a focus on a "back to basics" council.

Greg Dowling, a former United Australia Party (UAP) candidate and professional rugby league footballer, also ran for mayor on the "It's Time for Townsville" ticket. He was officially endorsed by UAP founder Clive Palmer, who spent $625,000 on supporting Dowling's campaign.

== Results ==
=== Mayor ===
2020 Queensland mayoral elections: Townsville
Party	Candidate	Votes	%	±%
Team Jenny Hill	Jenny Hill	46,911	50.64	−8.87
Independent	Sam Cox	25,076	27.07	+27.07
It's Time for Townsville	Greg Dowling	16,155	17.44	+17.44
NQ State Alliance	Chris Eastaughffe	4,498	4.86	+4.86
Turnout		95,509	74.27	−5.78
Two-candidate-preferred result
Team Jenny Hill	Jenny Hill	49,255	61.53	−1.16
Independent	Sam Cox	30,791	38.47	+38.47
Team Jenny Hill hold		Swing	−1.16	
