= Results of the 2008 Queensland local elections =

This is a list of local government area results for the 2008 Queensland local elections.

== Brisbane ==
=== Bracken Ridge ===
2008 Queensland local elections: Bracken Ridge Ward
Party	Candidate	Votes	%	±%
Liberal	Amanda Cooper	13,322	59.16	−6.26
Labor	Sean Waugh	7,332	32.56	+3.99
Greens	Janine Murphy	1,214	5.39	+0.62
Informal votes		440	1.92	−0.12
Two-party-preferred result
Liberal	Amanda Cooper	13,501	63.88	−5.31
Labor	Sean Waugh	7,634	36.12	+5.31
Liberal hold		Swing	−5.31	

=== Central ===
2008 Queensland local elections: Central Ward
Party	Candidate	Votes	%	±%
Liberal	Vicki Howard	8,709	41.96	+10.89
Labor	David Hinchliffe	8,219	39.60	–8.08
Greens	Anne Boccabella	3,450	16.61	–1.13
Independent	David White	379	1.83	+1.83
Total formal votes		20,757	98.39	+0.31
Informal votes		340	1.61	–0.31
Turnout		21,097	77.60	−
Two-party-preferred result
Labor	David Hinchliffe	9,173	50.28	–11.76
Liberal	Vicki Howard	9,071	49.72	+11.76
Labor hold		Swing	–11.76	

=== Chandler ===
2008 Queensland local elections: Chandler Ward
Party	Candidate	Votes	%	±%
Liberal	Adrian Schrinner	15,796	71.19	+3.25
Labor	Peter Lovegrove	6,393	28.81	–3.25
Informal votes		414	1.83	–0.37
Liberal hold		Swing	+5.59	

=== Deagon ===
2008 Brisbane City Council election: Deagon Ward
Party	Candidate	Votes	%	±%
Labor	Victoria Newton	11,305	51.66	−1.36
Liberal	Tony Feagan	8,315	38.00	+3.81
Greens	Peter Fagan	1,657	7.57	−5.22
Independent	John Harbison	368	1.68	+1.68
Independent	Jennifer Singfield	238	1.09	+1.09
Total formal votes		21,883	98.18	+0.38
Informal votes		405	1.82	−0.38
Turnout		22,288	87.54	−0.02
Two-party-preferred result
Labor	Victoria Newton	11,725	57.92	−3.07
Liberal	Tony Feagan	8,520	42.08	+3.07
Labor hold		Swing	−3.07	

=== Northgate ===
2008 Queensland local elections: Northgate Ward
Party	Candidate	Votes	%	±%
Labor	Kim Flesser	10,149	46.90	−2.21
Liberal	Kevin Parer	9,752	45.07	+5.84
Greens	Rory Dobson	1,737	8.03	−3.63
Total formal votes		21,638	98.24	+0.13
Informal votes		388	1.76	−0.13
Turnout		22,026	87.10	+0.46
Two-party-preferred result
Labor	Kim Flesser	10,611	51.55	−4.33
Liberal	Kevin Parer	9,972	48.45	+4.33
Labor hold		Swing		

=== Parkinson ===
2008 Queensland local elections: Parkinson Ward
Party	Candidate	Votes	%	±%
Liberal	Angela Owen-Taylor	10,980	51.64	+4.87
Labor	Linda Paton	8,364	39.34	−13.89
Greens	Robert Scott	1,919	9.03	+9.03
Informal votes		444	2.05	−0.92
Two-party-preferred result
Liberal	Angela Owen-Taylor	11,192	56.27	+9.50
Labor	Linda Paton	8,698	43.73	−9.50
Liberal gain from Labor		Swing	+9.50	

=== The Gabba ===
2008 Queensland local elections: The Gabba Ward
Party	Candidate	Votes	%	±%
Liberal	Matthew Myers	7,275	37.15	+8.04
Labor	Helen Abrahams	7,008	35.79	–4.32
Greens	Drew Hutton	5,021	25.64	–0.12
Independent	David Norton	279	1.42	+1.42
Informal votes		347	1.74	–0.44
Two-party-preferred result
Labor	Helen Abrahams	8,641	52.73	–6.97
Liberal	Matthew Myers	7,746	47.27	+6.97
Labor notional hold		Swing	–6.97	

=== Toowong Ward ===
2008 Brisbane City Council election: Toowong Ward
Party	Candidate	Votes	%	±%
Liberal National	Peter Matic	10,197	52.08	−1.94
Greens	Stuart Skabo	4,213	21.52	+2.45
Labor	Yvonne Li	4,582	26.40	−0.52
Total formal votes		18,114	98.71	+0.24
Informal votes		256	1.29	−0.24
Turnout		19,579	79.79	
Two-party-preferred result
Liberal National	Peter Matic	10,502	61.76	−0.95
Labor	Yvonne Li	6,502	38.24	+0.95
Liberal National hold		Swing	−0.95	

=== Walter Taylor ===
2008 Queensland local elections: Walter Taylor Ward
Party	Candidate	Votes	%	±%
Liberal	Jane Prentice	13,164	63.7	+1.8
Labor	Ryan Ginard	4,386	21.2	−2.6
Greens	Daniel Crute	3,133	15.2	+0.9
Total formal votes		20,683	-	−
Informal votes		268	1.3	−0.1
Turnout		20,951	-	−
Two-party-preferred result
Liberal	Jane Prentice	13,519	71.0	+2.2
Labor	Ryan Ginard	5,517	29.0	−2.2
Liberal hold		Swing	+2.2	

== Townsville ==
2008 Queensland local elections: Townsville
Party	Candidate	Votes	%	±%
Team Tyrell	David Crisafulli (elected)	47,040	4.87	
Team Tyrell	Jenny Lane (elected)	42,716	4.42	
Team Tyrell	Dale Last (elected)	38,865	4.02	
Team Tyrell	Rob McCahill (elected)	38,490	3.98	
Team Tyrell	Ray Gartrell (elected)	37,449	3.88	
Team Tyrell	Deanne Bell (elected)	37,474	3.88	
Team Tyrell	Sue Blom (elected)	37,362	3.87	
Team Tyrell	Brian Hewett (elected)	35,781	3.70	
Team Tyrell	Vern Veitch (elected)	35,152	3.64	
Labor	Jenny Hill (elected)	34,544	3.58	
Team Tyrell	Tony Parsons (elected)	33,951	3.51	
Team Tyrell	Natalie Marr (elected)	33,538	3.47	
Team Tyrell	Brenda-Anne Parfitt	30,466	3.15	
Labor	Terry Goldsworthy	27,494	2.85	
Labor	Jack Wilson	27,148	2.81	
Labor	Les Walker	26,423	2.74	
Labor	David Mather	26,142	2.71	
Labor	Peter Whalley-Thompson	25,625	2.65	
Labor	Mandy Johnstone	25,449	2.63	
Labor	John Robertson	25,409	2.63	
	Sandra Chesney	23,761	2.46	
	Joanne Keune	20,041	2.07	
	Jeff Jimmieson	19,188	1.99	
	David Moyle	19,093	1.98	
	Ken Turner	18,248	1.89	
Community Voices	Lindy Collins	17,095	1.77	
	Doug Kingston	16,820	1.74	
Community Voices	Gail Hamilton	14,336	1.48	
Community Voices	Sam Reuben	13,012	1.35	
	Mark McGregor	11,521	1.19	
	Jim Gleeson	11,142	1.15	
	Sue Rush	10,336	1.07	
	Adrienne Isnard	9,774	1.01	
	Dianne Rogers	9,126	0.94	
	Brian Bensley	7,498	0.78	
	Paul Lynham	7,096	0.73	
	Peter Hanley	7,040	0.73	
	Kenneth Stark	6,743	0.70	
	Gaye Newey	6,682	0.69	
	David Kault	6,587	0.68	
	Leeanne Hanna-McGuffie	6,071	0.63	
	Dave Robinson	5,981	0.62	
	Norm Petrie	5,726	0.59	
	Michael Collins	5,364	0.56	
	John Waszkiewicz	5,328	0.55	
	Peter Newey	5,038	0.52	
	Russell Bowe	4,335	0.45	
	Kevin Cameron	3,432	0.36	
	Harrison H. Duncan	3,164	0.33	
Total formal votes		966,096	100.0	
Total formal ballots		88,920	99.14	
Informal ballots		8,412	0.86	
Turnout		974,508	84.68	
Party total seats			Seats	±
Team Tyrell			11	▲11
Labor			1	
Independent			0	
Community Voices			0	Steady
