= 2008 Townsville City Council election =

- 15 March 2008
- Mayor
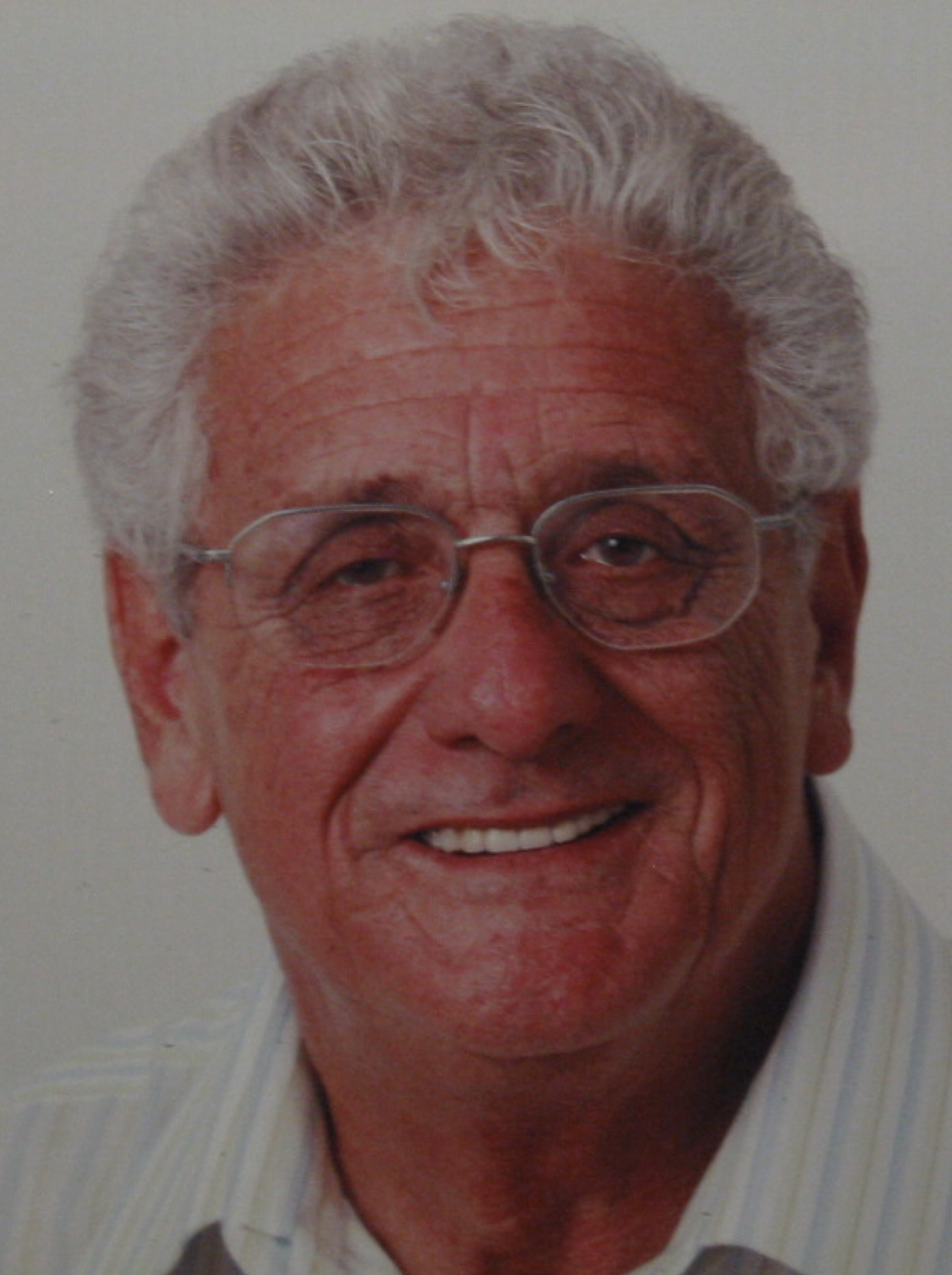

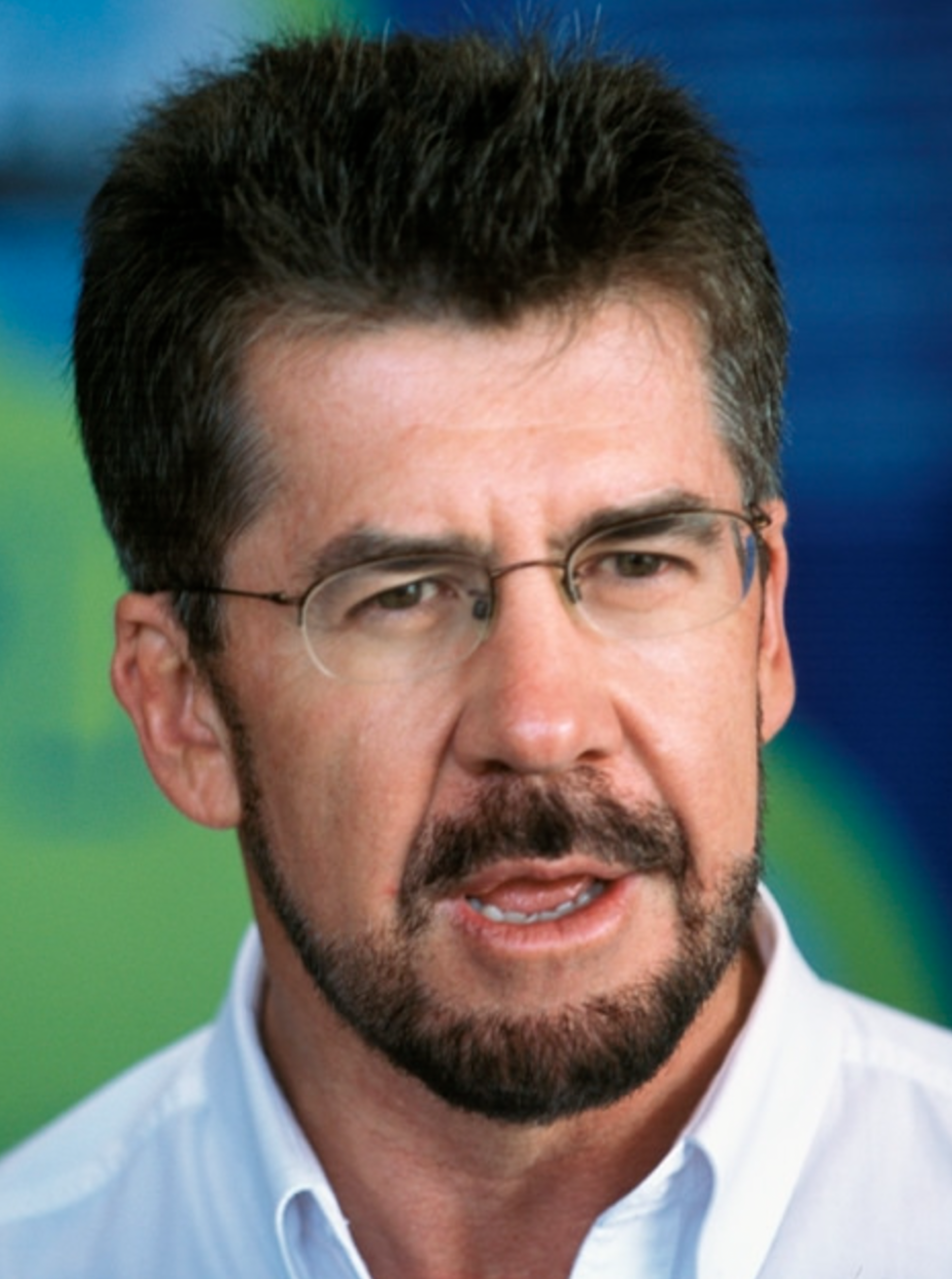
	First party	Second party
Candidate	Les Tyrell	Tony Mooney
Party	Team Tyrell	Labor
Popular vote	47,956	31,524
Percentage	54.64%	35.91%
Swing	▲54.64	▼37.65
Mayor before election
Tony Mooney
Labor
Subsequent Mayor
Les Tyrell
Team Tyrell
- Councillors
- All 13 members on the City Council (including the Mayor); 7 seats needed for a majority
Party	Leader	Vote %	Seats	+/–
Team Tyrell	Les Tyrell		11	+11
Labor	Tony Mooney		1	
This lists parties that won seats. See the complete results below.

The 2008 Townsville City Council election was held on 15 March 2008 to elect a mayor and 12 councillors to the City of Townsville. The election was held as part of the statewide local elections in Queensland, Australia.

The election saw the Australian Labor Party, which had controlled the council for 32 years − the longest-serving Labor administration in Australia − defeated in a landslide by the conservative Team Tyrell, which won all but one of the councillor positions. Incumbent mayor Tony Mooney was among the ALP members defeated.

As of 2025, this was the last time the ALP contested a Townsville City Council election.

== Background ==
Townsville City Council had been controlled by Labor since 1976. Tony Mooney had served as mayor since 1989, when he succeeded Mike Reynolds. At the previous election in 2004, Mooney won 73.56% of the primary vote and 80% of the two-candidate-preferred vote.

In 2007, the Queensland state government engaged in a programme of local government reform, focused on amalgamating local government areas (LGAs) across Queensland. It was recommended that the City of Thuringowa merge with the City of Townsville to form a new, larger council. Although there was some controversy, the merger ultimately took place, with the City of Thuringowa ceasing to exist on 15 March 2008 (the date of the local elections).

== Candidates ==
Les Tyrell, Thuringowa's mayor of 17 years, chose to contest the Townsville mayoral election, leading the Team Tyrell ticket. Incumbent Independent Liberal councillor David Crisafulli ran on the ticket in partnership with Tyrell as a deputy mayoral candidate.

The Greens led a ticket called "Community Voices", although only three out of eight candidates (including mayoral candidate Jenny Stirling) were Greens members.

== Results ==
=== Mayor ===
2008 Queensland mayoral elections: Townsville
Party	Candidate	Votes	%	±%
Team Tyrell	Les Tyrell	47,956	54.64	+54.64
Labor	Tony Mooney	31,524	35.91	−37.65
Community Voices	Jenny Stirling	6,343	7.23	
Independent	Rolando Taviani	1,292	1.47	
Independent	Francis Pauler	660	0.75	
Total formal votes		87,775	98.71	
Informal votes		1,145	1.29	
Turnout		88,920		
Team Tyrell gain from Labor		Swing		

=== Councillors ===
2008 Queensland local elections: Townsville
Party	Candidate	Votes	%	±%
Team Tyrell	David Crisafulli (elected)	47,040	4.87	
Team Tyrell	Jenny Lane (elected)	42,716	4.42	
Team Tyrell	Dale Last (elected)	38,865	4.02	
Team Tyrell	Rob McCahill (elected)	38,490	3.98	
Team Tyrell	Ray Gartrell (elected)	37,449	3.88	
Team Tyrell	Deanne Bell (elected)	37,474	3.88	
Team Tyrell	Sue Blom (elected)	37,362	3.87	
Team Tyrell	Brian Hewett (elected)	35,781	3.70	
Team Tyrell	Vern Veitch (elected)	35,152	3.64	
Labor	Jenny Hill (elected)	34,544	3.58	
Team Tyrell	Tony Parsons (elected)	33,951	3.51	
Team Tyrell	Natalie Marr (elected)	33,538	3.47	
Team Tyrell	Brenda-Anne Parfitt	30,466	3.15	
Labor	Terry Goldsworthy	27,494	2.85	
Labor	Jack Wilson	27,148	2.81	
Labor	Les Walker	26,423	2.74	
Labor	David Mather	26,142	2.71	
Labor	Peter Whalley-Thompson	25,625	2.65	
Labor	Mandy Johnstone	25,449	2.63	
Labor	John Robertson	25,409	2.63	
	Sandra Chesney	23,761	2.46	
	Joanne Keune	20,041	2.07	
	Jeff Jimmieson	19,188	1.99	
	David Moyle	19,093	1.98	
	Ken Turner	18,248	1.89	
Community Voices	Lindy Collins	17,095	1.77	
	Doug Kingston	16,820	1.74	
Community Voices	Gail Hamilton	14,336	1.48	
Community Voices	Sam Reuben	13,012	1.35	
	Mark McGregor	11,521	1.19	
	Jim Gleeson	11,142	1.15	
	Sue Rush	10,336	1.07	
	Adrienne Isnard	9,774	1.01	
	Dianne Rogers	9,126	0.94	
	Brian Bensley	7,498	0.78	
	Paul Lynham	7,096	0.73	
	Peter Hanley	7,040	0.73	
	Kenneth Stark	6,743	0.70	
	Gaye Newey	6,682	0.69	
	David Kault	6,587	0.68	
	Leeanne Hanna-McGuffie	6,071	0.63	
	Dave Robinson	5,981	0.62	
	Norm Petrie	5,726	0.59	
	Michael Collins	5,364	0.56	
	John Waszkiewicz	5,328	0.55	
	Peter Newey	5,038	0.52	
	Russell Bowe	4,335	0.45	
	Kevin Cameron	3,432	0.36	
	Harrison H. Duncan	3,164	0.33	
Total formal votes		966,096	100.0	
Total formal ballots		88,920	99.14	
Informal ballots		8,412	0.86	
Turnout		974,508	84.68	
Party total seats			Seats	±
Team Tyrell			11	▲11
Labor			1	
Independent			0	
Community Voices			0	Steady
