= 2016 Townsville City Council election =

Australian local election

- 19 March 2016

All 11 councillors (including the mayor) 6 seats needed for a majority
- Mayor
- Turnout: 80.05%
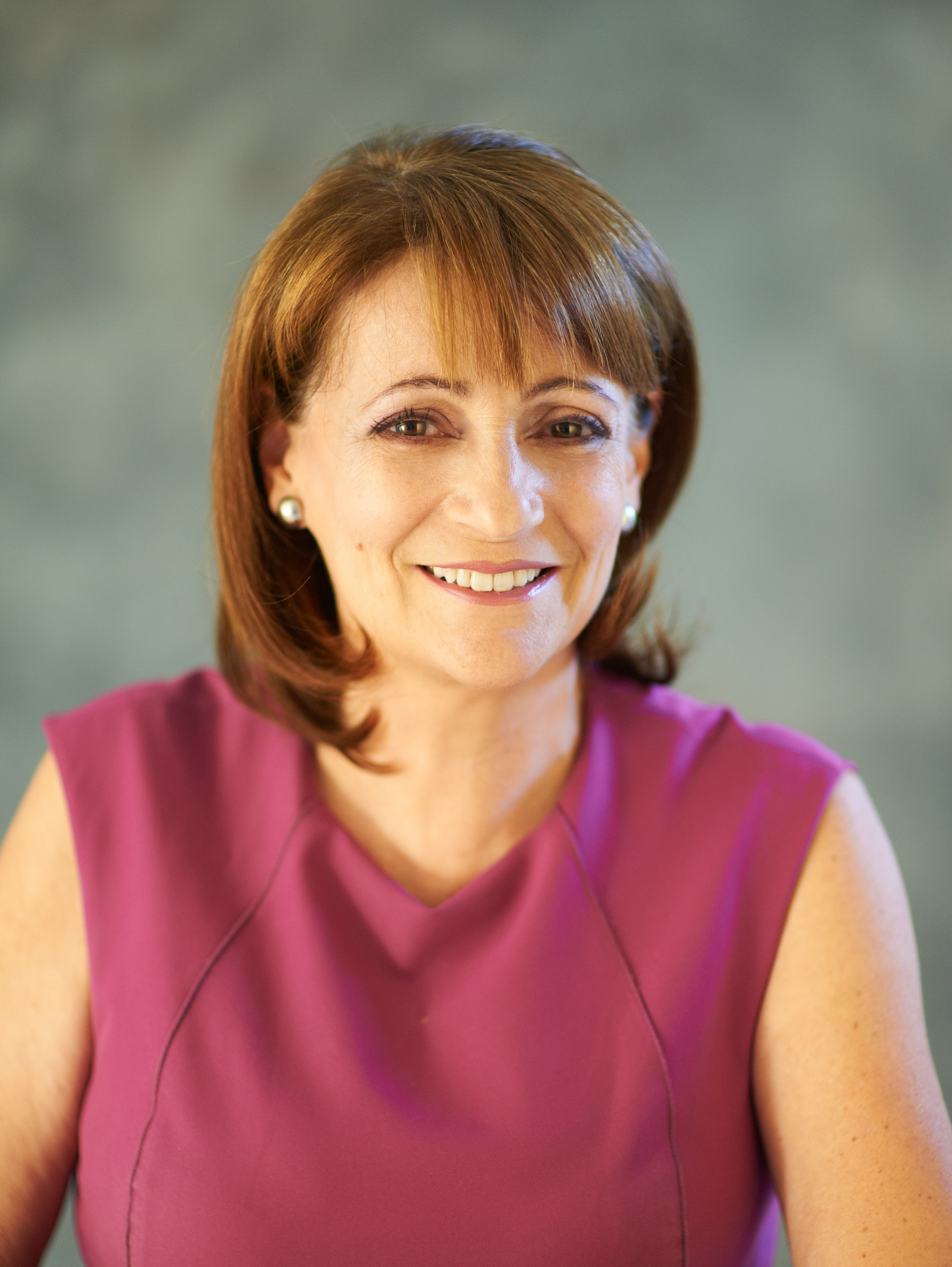
| | First party | Second party |
|---|---|---|
| | | JAT |
| Candidate | Jenny Hill | Jayne Arlett |
| Party | Team Jenny Hill | Jayne Arlett's Team |
| Primary vote | 58,862 | 34,849 |
| Percentage | 59.51% | 35.23% |
| Swing | ▲25.77 | ▲35.23 |
| TCP | 62.69% | 37.31% |
| TCP swing | ▲11.11 | ▲37.31 |
Mayor before election
Jenny Hill
Team Jenny Hill
Elected Mayor
Jenny Hill
Team Jenny Hill
- Councillors
| Party | Leader | Vote % | Seats | +/– |
|---|---|---|---|---|
| Team Jenny Hill | Jenny Hill | 53.79 | 10 | +8 |
This lists parties that won seats. See the complete results below.

The 2016 Townsville City Council election was held on 19 March 2016 to elect a mayor and 10 councillors to the City of Townsville. The election was held as part of the statewide local elections in Queensland, Australia.

Team Jenny Hill defeated Jayne Arlett's Team in a landslide victory, winning every ward and retaining the mayoralty.

== Background ==
At the previous election in 2012, councillor Team Jenny Hill narrowly won the mayoralty following the retirement of Les Tyrell. Seven Townsville First candidates were elected, while only two members of Hill's team won seats.

== Candidates ==
On 21 October 2015, businesswoman and Townsville Fire chairwoman Jayne Arlett announced she would run for mayor. In December 2015, she announced she would run a team of candidates in all wards, which included incumbent Townsville First councillors Ray Gartrell, Sue Blom, Gary Eddiehausen, Trevor Roberts and Tony Parsons.

Team Hill ran candidates in all wards, including their two incumbent councillors − Colleen Doyle (Division 9) and Les Walker (Division 10).

First-term independent councillor Pat Ernst announced in November 2015 that he would not seek re-election in Division 5.

== Results ==
=== Mayor ===
2016 Queensland mayoral elections: Townsville
| Party | Candidate | Votes | % | ±% |
|---|---|---|---|---|
| Team Jenny Hill | Jenny Hill | 58,862 | 59.51 | +25.77 |
| Jayne Arlett's Team | Jayne Arlett | 34,849 | 35.23 | +35.23 |
| Independent | William Hankin | 3,237 | 3.27 | +3.27 |
| Independent | Harry Patel | 1,970 | 1.99 | +0.20 |
| Total formal votes | | 98,918 | 97.01 | +0.67 |
| Informal votes | | 3,207 | 2.99 | −0.67 |
| Turnout | | 101,965 | 80.05 | |
Two-candidate-preferred result
| Team Jenny Hill | Jenny Hill | 59,881 | 62.69 | +11.11 |
| Jayne Arlett's Team | Jayne Arlett | 35,639 | 37.31 | +37.31 |
| Team Jenny Hill hold | | Swing | +11.11 | |

=== Councillors ===
2016 Queensland local elections: Townsville
| Party | Votes | % | Swing | Seats | Change |
|---|---|---|---|---|---|
| Team Jenny Hill | 53,093 | 53.79 | | 10 | ▲8 |
| Jayne Arlett's Team | 38,306 | 38.81 | +38.81 | 0 | Steady |
| Independent | 7,297 | 7.39 | | 0 | ▼1 |
| Formal votes | 98,696 | | | | |

=== Division 1 ===
2016 Queensland local elections: Division 1
| Party | Candidate | Votes | % | ±% |
|---|---|---|---|---|
| Team Jenny Hill | Margie Ryder | 5,786 | 58.30 | |
| Jayne Arlett's Team | Tony Parsons | 4,138 | 41.70 | |
| Turnout | | 10,281 | 83.10 | |
| Team Jenny Hill gain from Jayne Arlett's Team | | Swing | | |

- Incumbent councillor Sue Blom (Townsville First, later Jayne Arlett's Team) contested Division 2

=== Division 2 ===
2016 Queensland local elections: Division 2
| Party | Candidate | Votes | % | ±% |
|---|---|---|---|---|
| Team Jenny Hill | Paul Jacob | 5,485 | 56.83 | |
| Jayne Arlett's Team | Sue Blom | 4,167 | 43.17 | |
| Turnout | | 10,052 | 80.42 | |
| Team Jenny Hill gain from Jayne Arlett's Team | | Swing | | |

- Incumbent councillor Tony Parsons (Townsville First, later Jayne Arlett's Team) contested Division 1

=== Division 3 ===
2016 Queensland local elections: Division 3
| Party | Candidate | Votes | % | ±% |
|---|---|---|---|---|
| Team Jenny Hill | Ann-Maree Greaney | 4,292 | 45.68 | |
| Jayne Arlett's Team | Gerry Maguire | 2,839 | 30.22 | |
| Independent | Vern Veitch | 2,264 | 24.10 | |
| Turnout | | 9,726 | 75.21 | |
Two-candidate-preferred result
| Team Jenny Hill | Ann-Maree Greaney | 4,590 | 59.65 | |
| Jayne Arlett's Team | Gerry Maguire | 3,105 | 40.35 | |
| Team Jenny Hill gain from Independent | | Swing | | |

- Incumbent councillor Vern Veitch moved from Townsville First to Independent

=== Division 4 ===
2016 Queensland local elections: Division 4
| Party | Candidate | Votes | % | ±% |
|---|---|---|---|---|
| Team Jenny Hill | Mark Molachino | 4,181 | 42.88 | |
| Jayne Arlett's Team | Marcel McLeod | 2,581 | 26.47 | |
| Independent | Joanne Keune | 1,969 | 20.19 | |
| Independent | Guy Reece | 1,020 | 10.46 | |
| Turnout | | 10,161 | 82.01 | |
Two-candidate-preferred result
| Team Jenny Hill | Mark Molachino | 5,023 | 62.35 | |
| Jayne Arlett's Team | Marcel McLeod | 3,033 | 37.65 | |
| Team Jenny Hill gain from Townsville First | | Swing | | |

- Incumbent councillor Jenny Lane (Townsville First) did not recontest

=== Division 5 ===
2016 Queensland local elections: Division 5
| Party | Candidate | Votes | % | ±% |
|---|---|---|---|---|
| Team Jenny Hill | Russ Cook | 5,354 | 51.33 | |
| Jayne Arlett's Team | Janelle Poole | 4,281 | 41.04 | |
| Independent | Craig Leonard | 796 | 7.63 | |
| Turnout | | 10,870 | 83.45 | |
Two-candidate-preferred result
| Team Jenny Hill | Russ Cook | 5,453 | 55.32 | |
| Jayne Arlett's Team | Janelle Poole | 4,404 | 44.68 | |
| Team Jenny Hill gain from Independent | | Swing | | |

- Incumbent councillor Pat Ernst (Independent) did not recontest

=== Division 6 ===
2016 Queensland local elections: Division 6
| Party | Candidate | Votes | % | ±% |
|---|---|---|---|---|
| Team Jenny Hill | Verena Coombe | 5,158 | 52.42 | |
| Jayne Arlett's Team | Trevor Roberts | 4,681 | 47.58 | |
| Turnout | | 10,138 | 79.45 | |
| Team Jenny Hill gain from Jayne Arlett's Team | | Swing | | |

- Incumbent councillor Trevor Roberts moved from Townsville First to Jayne Arlett's Team

=== Division 7 ===
2016 Queensland local elections: Division 7
| Party | Candidate | Votes | % | ±% |
|---|---|---|---|---|
| Team Jenny Hill | Kurt Rehbein | 5,732 | 56.65 | |
| Jayne Arlett's Team | Gary Eddiehausen | 4,386 | 43.35 | |
| Turnout | | 10,457 | 84.03 | |
| Team Jenny Hill gain from Jayne Arlett's Team | | Swing | | |

- Incumbent councillor Gary Eddiehausen moved from Townsville First to Jayne Arlett's Team

=== Division 8 ===
2016 Queensland local elections: Division 8
| Party | Candidate | Votes | % | ±% |
|---|---|---|---|---|
| Team Jenny Hill | Maurie Soars | 4,445 | 46.91 | |
| Jayne Arlett's Team | Ray Gartrell | 4,357 | 45.98 | |
| Independent | Gregory Wright | 673 | 7.10 | |
| Turnout | | 9,816 | 82.63 | |
Two-candidate-preferred result
| Team Jenny Hill | Maurie Soars | 4,532 | 50.27 | |
| Jayne Arlett's Team | Ray Gartrell | 4,483 | 49.73 | |
| Team Jenny Hill gain from Jayne Arlett's Team | | Swing | | |

- Incumbent councillor Ray Gartrell moved from Townsville First to Jayne Arlett's Team

=== Division 9 ===
2016 Queensland local elections: Division 9
| Party | Candidate | Votes | % | ±% |
|---|---|---|---|---|
| Team Jenny Hill | Colleen Doyle | 5,910 | 64.13 | |
| Jayne Arlett's Team | Muriel Bin Dol | 3,306 | 35.87 | |
| Turnout | | 9,541 | 78.54 | |
| Team Jenny Hill hold | | Swing | | |

=== Division 10 ===
2016 Queensland local elections: Division 10
| Party | Candidate | Votes | % | ±% |
|---|---|---|---|---|
| Team Jenny Hill | Les Walker | 6,750 | 65.41 | |
| Jayne Arlett's Team | Michael Charge | 3,570 | 34.49 | |
| Turnout | | 10,617 | 83.62 | |
| Team Jenny Hill hold | | Swing | | |
