= Troy Thompson =

Troy Thompson may refer to:

- Troy Thompson (rugby league), rugby league player for the Canberra Raiders
- Troy Thompson (guitarist), guitarist in Christian metal band Bride
- Troy Thompson (politician), Australian politician and mayor of Townsville
