= 1933 Townsville City Council election =

- 8 April 1933
- Mayor
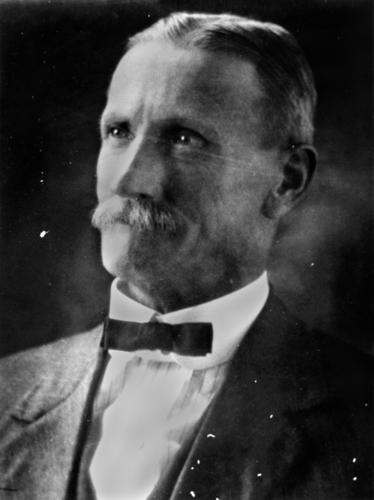
	First party	Second party	Third party
	IND		PRO
Candidate	John Gill	Anthony Ogden	John Clegg
Party	Independent	Labor	Progressive
Mayor before election
William John Heatley
Independent
Subsequent Mayor
John Stewart Gill
Independent
- Councillors
Party	Leader	Vote %	Seats	+/–
Labor	Anthony Ogden			
Independent	N/A			
Progressive	John Clegg			
This lists parties that won seats. See the complete results below.

The 1933 Townsville City Council election was held on 8 April 1933 to elect a mayor and councillors to the City of Townsville. The election was held as part of the statewide local elections in Queensland, Australia.

The mayoral election was won by independent candidate John Stewart Gill, after incumbent William John Heatley did not seek re-election.

== Results ==
=== Mayor ===
1933 Queensland mayoral elections: Townsville
Party	Candidate	Votes	%	±%
Independent	John Stewart Gill		<50.0	
Labor	Anthony Ogden			
Progressive	John Edward Clegg			
Independent hold		Swing		

- Incumbent mayor William John Heatley (Independent) did not recontest
