= 2012 Townsville City Council election =

Local election in Queensland, Australia

- 28 April 2012
- Mayor
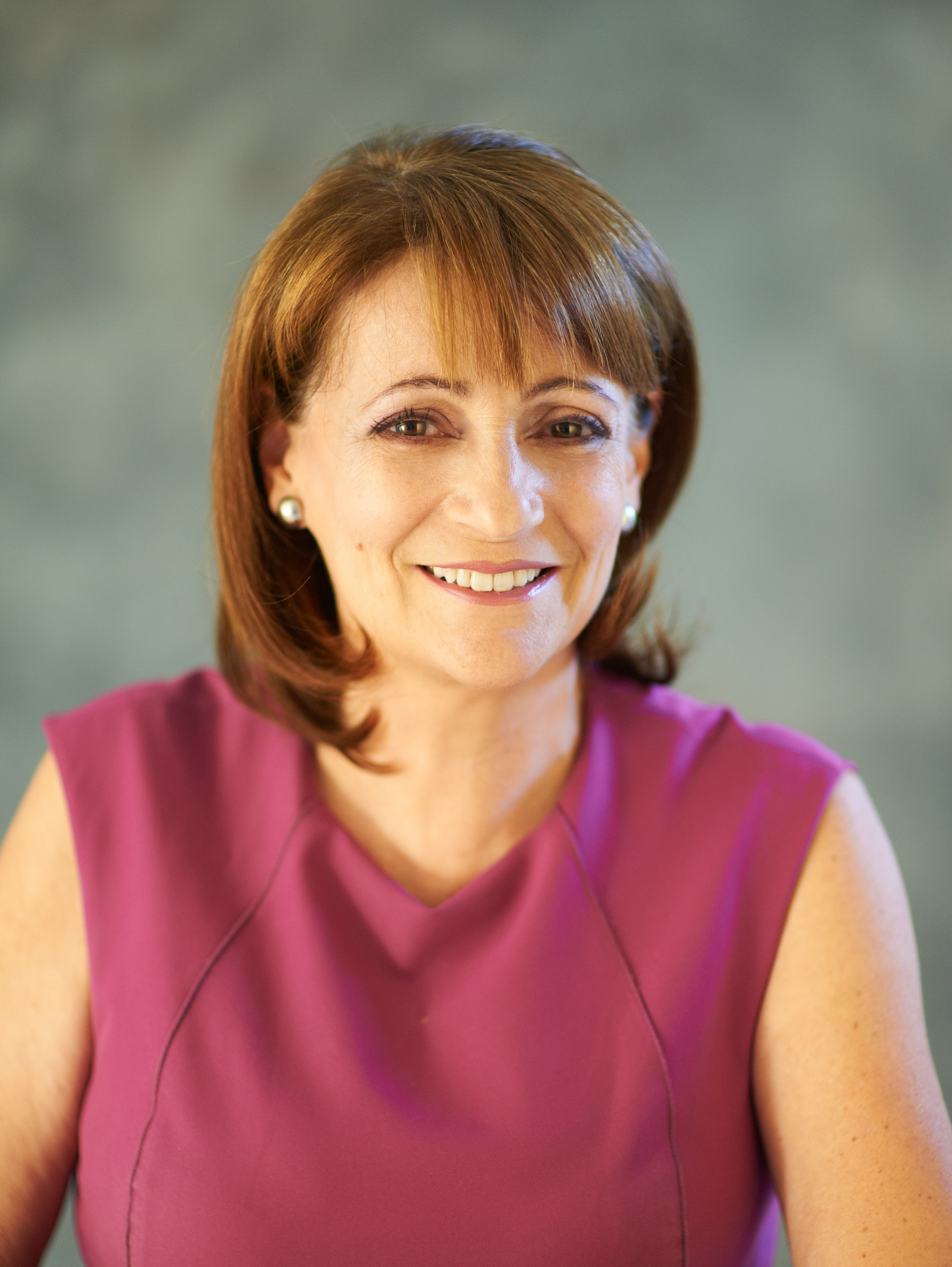
	First party	Second party	Third party
		TF	IND
Candidate	Jenny Hill	Dale Last	Jeff Jimmieson
Party	Team Jenny Hill	Townsville First	Independent
Popular vote	28,508	26,898	15,301
Percentage	33.74%	31.83%	18.11%
Swing	▲33.74	▲31.83	▲18.11
2CP	51.58%	48.42%
2CP swing	▲51.58	▲48.42
Mayor before election
Les Tyrell
Team Tyrell
Subsequent Mayor
Jenny Hill
Team Jenny Hill
- Councillors
- All 11 members on the City Council (including the Mayor); 6 seats needed for a majority
Party	Leader	Vote %	Seats	+/–
Townsville First	Dale Last		7	+7
Team Jenny Hill	Jenny Hill		2	+2
Independent	N/A		1	+1
This lists parties that won seats. See the complete results below.

The 2012 Townsville City Council election was held on 28 April 2012 to elect a mayor and 10 councillors to the City of Townsville. The election was held as part of the statewide local elections in Queensland, Australia.

Incumbent mayor Les Tyrell chose to retire from politics and did not recontest his position. Councillor Jenny Hill narrowly won the mayoralty with 51.58% of the vote after preferences, however Townsville First won a majority on council.

== Background ==
At the previous election in 2008, the Labor Party, which had controlled the council for 32 years − the longest-serving Labor administration in Australia − was defeated in a landslide by the conservative Team Tyrell, which won all but one of the councillor positions. Incumbent mayor Tony Mooney was among the ALP members defeated.

Less than a year after being elected, Team Tyrell councillor Rob McCahill announced his resignation on 9 October 2008, claiming that a "political witch-hunt" was threatening to destroy his family. As the council was unsubdivided, the entire LGA had to vote in the by-election on 22 November, which was won by independent candidate Trevor Roberts. Team Tyrell did not contest the election.

Changes to the council's structure were brought in for the 2012 election, with 10 single-member wards (also known as divisions) introduced.

== Candidates ==
Incumbent mayor Les Tyrell announced on 27 October 2011 that he would retire from politics after 32 years, which included 17 years as Thuringowa mayor.

Councillor Dale Last, who was elected on the Team Tyrell ticket in 2008, announced he would run for mayor and lead the Townsville First group, which ran candidates − including six serving Team Tyrell councillors − in all wards. Trevor Roberts also stood for the group.

Labor did not contest the election. Jenny Hill, the only sitting Labor member on council, also ran for the mayoralty and formed Team Jenny Hill.

== Results ==
=== Mayor ===
2012 Queensland mayoral elections: Townsville
Party	Candidate	Votes	%	±%
Team Jenny Hill	Jenny Hill	28,508	33.74	+33.74
Townsville First	Dale Last	26,898	31.83	+31.83
Independent	Jeff Jimmieson	15,301	18.11	+18.11
Independent	Brendan Porter	12,277	14.53	+14.53
Independent	Harry Patel	1,516	1.79	+1.79
Total formal votes		84,500	96.34	−2.37
Informal votes		3,207	3.66	+2.37
Turnout		87,707	80.05	
Two-candidate-preferred result
Team Jenny Hill	Jenny Hill	32,946	51.58	+51.58
Townsville First	Dale Last	30,928	48.42	+48.42
Team Jenny Hill gain from Team Tyrell		Swing		

- Incumbent mayor Les Tyrell (Team Tyrell) did not recontest
