= 2024 Townsville City Council election =

Australian local election

← 2020	16 March 2024	2028 →

All 11 seats on Townsville City Council 6 seats needed for a majority
- Mayor
- Turnout: 79.21% (▲4.94)
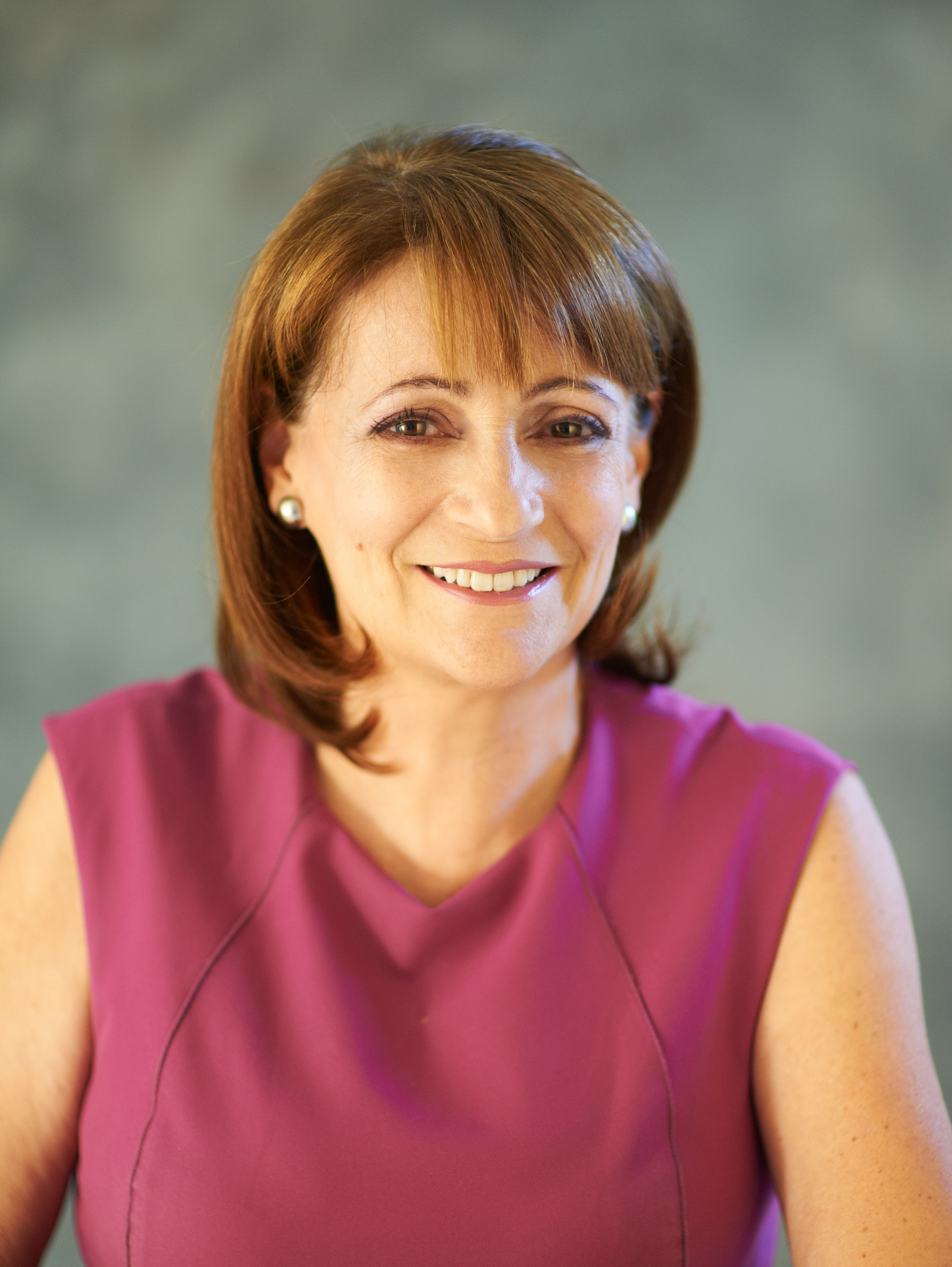
	First party	Second party	Third party
	IND		IND
Candidate	Troy Thompson	Jenny Hill	Harry Patel
Party	Independent	Team Jenny Hill	Independent
Primary vote	50,167	47,415	10,529
Percentage	46.60%	43.86%	9.74%
Swing	▲46.60	▼6.78	▲9.74
TCP	52.62%	47.38%
TCP swing	▲52.62	▼14.15
Mayor before election
Jenny Hill
Team Jenny Hill
Elected Mayor
Troy Thompson
Independent
- Councillors
- All 11 members on the City Council (including the Mayor); 6 seats needed for a majority
Party	Leader	Vote %	Seats	+/–
Team Jenny Hill	Jenny Hill		4	−5
Independents	N/A		3	+2
TownsvilleCHANGE	Paul Jacob		2	+2
Ind. LNP	N/A		1	+1
This lists parties that won seats. See the complete results below.

The 2024 Townsville City Council election was held on 16 March 2024 to elect a mayor and 10 councillors to the City of Townsville. The election was held as part of the statewide local elections in Queensland, Australia.

Incumbent mayor Jenny Hill was defeated after 12 years in the position by independent candidate Troy Thompson. She officially conceded defeat on 27 March.

== Candidates ==
Jenny Hill, who had been serving as mayor since the 2012 election, confirmed in 2023 she would seek re-election. In August 2023, Shari Fabbro and Ben Fusco were announced as Team Hill candidates for Division 2 and Division 10 respectively (the only wards not held by Team Hill).

Troy Thompson contested the mayoralty as an independent candidate. He had been disendorsed as the One Nation candidate for Thuringowa at the 2020 Queensland state election because he did not disclose his legal name and directorship in a company that went insolvent.

Division 10 councillor Fran O'Callaghan withdrew from the mayoral election on 2 February 2024, citing health reasons, and did not recontest her seat.

== Campaign ==
Thompson was supported by the local chapter of My Place Australia, a conspiracy theorist group with around 50 active Facebook groups in Queensland.

== Results ==
=== Mayor ===
2024 Queensland mayoral elections: Townsville
Party	Candidate	Votes	%	±%
Independent	Troy Thompson	50,167	46.60	+46.60
Team Jenny Hill	Jenny Hill	47,415	43.86	−6.78
Independent	Harry Patel	10,529	9.74	+9.74
Total formal votes		108,111	96.51	
Informal votes		3,909	3.49	
Turnout		112,020	79.21	+4.94
Two-candidate-preferred result
Independent	Troy Thompson	53,956	52.62	+52.62
Team Jenny Hill	Jenny Hill	48,575	47.38	−14.15
Independent gain from Team Jenny Hill		Swing	N/A	

=== Division 1 ===
2024 Queensland local elections: Division 1
Party	Candidate	Votes	%	±%
TownsvilleCHANGE	Paul Jacob	6,669	55.99	
Team Jenny Hill	Margie Ryder	5,327	44.41	
Turnout		12,462	80.93	
TownsvilleCHANGE gain from Team Jenny Hill		Swing		

=== Division 2 ===
2024 Queensland local elections: Division 2
Party	Candidate	Votes	%	±%
Independent	Brodie Phillips	6,888	62.48	
Team Jenny Hill	Shari Fabbro	2,797	25.36	
TownsvilleCHANGE	Jai Philpots	1,343	12.18	
Turnout		11,400	80.32	
Two-candidate-preferred result
Independent	Brodie Phillips	7,346	71.72	
Team Jenny Hill	Shari Fabbro	2,897	28.28	
Independent hold		Swing		

- Incumbent councillor Sue Blom (Independent) did not recontest

=== Division 3 ===
2024 Queensland local elections: Division 3
Party	Candidate	Votes	%	±%
Team Jenny Hill	Ann-Maree Greaney	4,971	47.46	
Independent	Alan Sheret	2,803	26.76	
TownsvilleCHANGE	Jake Farrell	2,701	25.79	
Turnout		10,909	75.04	
Two-candidate-preferred result
Team Jenny Hill	Ann-Maree Greaney	5,305	58.87	
Independent	Alan Sheret	3,706	41.83	
Team Jenny Hill hold		Swing		

=== Division 4 ===
2024 Queensland local elections: Division 4
Party	Candidate	Votes	%	±%
Independent	Kristian Price	5,637	54.78	
Team Jenny Hill	Mark Molachino	4,653	45.22	
Turnout		10,716	75.14	
Independent gain from Team Jenny Hill		Swing		

=== Division 5 ===
2024 Queensland local elections: Division 5
Party	Candidate	Votes	%	±%
TownsvilleCHANGE	Vera Dirou	5,478	51.03	
Team Jenny Hill	Russ Cook	5,256	48.97	
Turnout		11,115	80.47	
TownsvilleCHANGE gain from Team Jenny Hill		Swing		

=== Division 6 ===
2024 Queensland local elections: Division 6
Party	Candidate	Votes	%	±%
Team Jenny Hill	Suzy Batkovic	unopposed		
Registered electors				
Team Jenny Hill hold		Swing		

=== Division 7 ===
2024 Queensland local elections: Division 7
Party	Candidate	Votes	%	±%
Team Jenny Hill	Kurt Rehbein	unopposed		
Registered electors				
Team Jenny Hill hold		Swing		

=== Division 8 ===
2024 Queensland local elections: Division 8
Party	Candidate	Votes	%	±%
Team Jenny Hill	Rachael Armstrong	4,164	40.45	
Independent	Andrew Robinson	3,717	36.11	
TownsvilleCHANGE	Guy Reece	2,412	23.43	
Turnout		10,732	77.95	
Two-candidate-preferred result
Independent	Andrew Robinson	4,524	50.64	
Team Jenny Hill	Rachael Armstrong	4,409	49.36	
Independent gain from Team Jenny Hill		Swing		

=== Division 9 ===
2024 Queensland local elections: Division 9
Party	Candidate	Votes	%	±%
Team Jenny Hill	Liam Mooney	3,721	37.87	
Independent	Erica Keam	2,811	28.61	
Independent	Michael Edmonds	1,844	18.77	
Greens	Benjamin Tiley	1,450	14.76	
Turnout		10,162	75.09	
Two-candidate-preferred result
Team Jenny Hill	Liam Mooney	4,183	52.62	
Independent	Erica Keam	3,767	47.38	
Team Jenny Hill hold		Swing		

=== Division 10 ===
2024 Queensland local elections: Division 10
Party	Candidate	Votes	%	±%
Independent LNP	Brady Ellis	4,776	44.06	
Team Jenny Hill	Ben Fusco	4,355	40.18	
Independent	Kate Annetts	1,709	15.77	
Turnout		11,101	81.20	
Two-candidate-preferred result
Independent LNP	Brady Ellis	5,323	53.84	
Team Jenny Hill	Ben Fusco	4,563	46.16	
Independent LNP gain from NQ State Alliance		Swing		

- Won by NQ State Alliance at a 2021 by-election after resignation of Les Walker (Team Jenny Hill)
- Incumbent councillor Fran O'Callaghan (NQ State Alliance) did not recontest
