= William John Heatley =

37th Mayor of Townsville

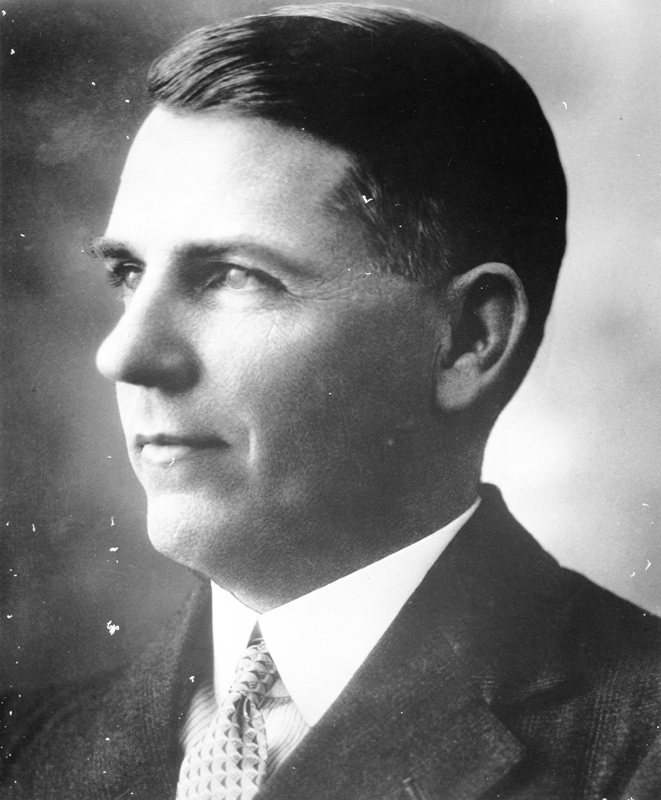

37th Mayor of the City of Townsville
- In office 1927 – April 8, 1933
- Preceded by: Anthony Ogden
- Succeeded by: John Stewart Mitchell

Personal details
- Spouse: Minnie Williams

William John Heatley(1890/1891 – 1944) was, an Australian businessman and the 37th mayor of Townsville.
