= Riccardo Bosi =

Australian conspiracy theorist (born 1960)

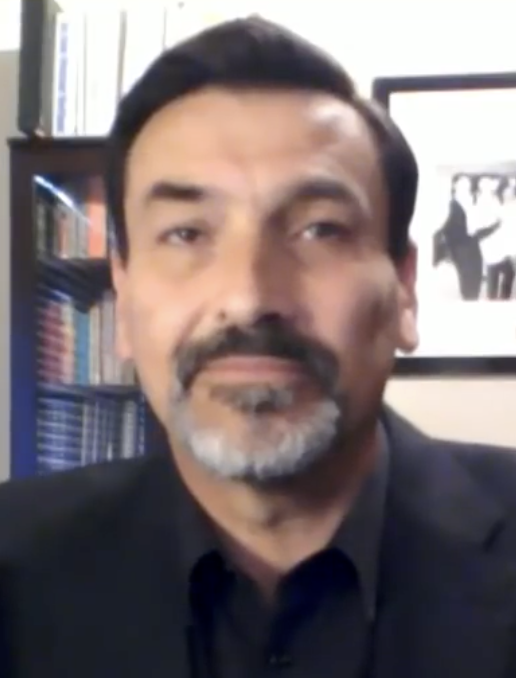

Leader of Australia One
- Incumbent
- Assumed office 5 October 2019

Personal details
- Born: Riccardo Umberto Guerrino Bosi; 9 March 1960 (age 66) Sydney, Australia
- Party: Australia One (2019−present)
- Other political affiliations: Australian Conservatives (2018−2019)

Riccardo Umberto Guerrino Bosi (born 9 March 1960) is an Australian conspiracy theorist and former Australian Army Special Forces lieutenant colonel. He is the founder of the AustraliaOne political party. Bosi is known for pushing COVID-19 misinformation and genocide denial.

== Early life ==
Bosi was born and raised in Sydney. Both of his parents are Italian immigrants to Australia.

== Political career ==
Bosi ran in second place on the Australian Conservatives senate ticket in New South Wales at the 2019 federal election. He was unsuccessful, with the party only receiving 0.49% of the vote. Shortly after the election, he founded the Australia One Party.

Bosi contested the 2020 Eden-Monaro by-election, receiving 513 votes (or 0.54%), the second-lowest of any candidate.

Bosi unsuccessfully contested the electorate of Greenway at the 2022 federal election, receiving 3.25% of the vote. He later led a "Riccardo Bosi" ticket at the Legislative Council at the 2023 New South Wales state election, which received 0.78% of the vote.

=== AustraliaOne ===
Australia One
- Abbreviation: A1
- Leader: Riccardo Bosi
- Founded: 5 October 2019
- Ideology: Conservatism
- Political position: Right-wing to far-right
- Slogan: "Our best future"

In October 2019, Bosi founded an Australian political party, AustraliaOne (not to be confused with One Australia Party, which was founded in 1995 and deregistered in 1999). AustraliaOne has not registered with any electoral commission, at state or federal levels, five years after its inception.

Australia One endorsed candidates at the 2022 federal election, 2022 Victorian state election and 2023 New South Wales state election. They included Darren Bergwerf, who has run for the party twice. Bergwerf later founded conspiracy theory group My Place Australia. The party ran 18 candidates for the New South Wales Legislative Council at the 2023 New South Wales state election. They received 0.78% of the vote.

== Conspiracy theories ==
In 2021, Bosi was charged with breaching South Australia's COVID-19 rules. During a subsequent court hearing, he told Magistrate Jack Fahey "You have no standing, you are at worst a traitor and at best an imbecile, the truth of which will be determined in due course". Fahey then hung up on Bosi, who was appearing via phone.

Bosi has been described by the Australian Associated Press as a "serial misinformation spreader" as a result of conspiracy theories he has promoted on social media. They include claims that political parties are unconstitutional, that Ukraine is not a sovereign state, and that votes in the 2023 New South Wales state election would be tampered with. He has appeared on InfoWars with Alex Jones, discussing Australia's transformation "into North Korea".

Bosi has been described as preaching a mixture of QAnon and Sovereign citizen beliefs. In February 2025, he told online followers that it was a lie that 6 million Jews had died in the holocaust. Bosi also claimed that doctor's were being paid for the body parts of aborted fetuses. He has previously called for politicians, judges, doctors, journalists or anyone who supported the "COVID hoax" to be hanged.
