= Mike Reynolds (Australian politician) =

Australian politician

The Hon Mike Reynolds CBE AM
- Reynolds in 2008

Speaker of the Legislative Assembly of Queensland
- In office 10 October 2006 – 23 February 2009
- Preceded by: Tony McGrady
- Succeeded by: John Mickel
- Constituency: Townsville

Member of the Queensland Legislative Assembly for Townsville
- In office 13 June 1998 – 20 March 2009
- Preceded by: Geoff Smith
- Succeeded by: Mandy Johnstone

Personal details
- Born: Michael Francis Reynolds; 16 September 1946 (age 80) Manly, New South Wales, Australia
- Party: Labor
- Spouse: Janice Mayes
- Education: James Cook University

Michael Francis Reynolds AM CBE (born 16 September 1946) is an Australian politician. He was a Labor member of the Legislative Assembly of Queensland from 1998 to 2009, representing the district of Townsville. He served as Speaker of the Legislative Assembly of Queensland from 2006 to 2009.

== Biography ==
Reynolds was first elected to parliament at the 1998 state election. Before being elected as Speaker by the 52nd Parliament in 2006, he was the inaugural Minister for Child Safety from 2004 to 2006 with Ministerial responsibilities for adoptions, child protection services, foster/kinship carers etc.

Prior to the Child Safety portfolio Reynolds was the Minister for Emergency Services and Minister Assisting the Premier in North Queensland from 2001 to 2004. In Reynolds's first parliamentary term he held the position of Parliamentary Secretary to the Premier in North Queensland.

Prior to his election to parliament, Reynolds held the positions of Director, Northern Australia Social Research Institute and Director, Centre for Social and Welfare Research, both at James Cook University. He was also visiting professor of Local Government Studies at the University of Canberra. From 1990 to 1996, he was Chairman of the Townsville Port Authority.

Reynolds' local government service has included 16 years as a member of the Townsville City Council. During this time he was Deputy Mayor of Townsville from 1976 to 1980, then Mayor of Townsville from 1980 to 1989. Reynolds was a member of the State Executive of the Local Government Association of Queensland from 1983 to 1989 and was appointed a Member of the Order of Australia (AM) in the 1985 Queen's Birthday Honours for service to local government and community.

Reynolds also acted as Chair of the Queensland Ministerial Advisory Committee on Child Care from 1991 to 1992, was a member of the Queensland Pacific Technology Program Committee in the Premiers Department from 1991 to 1992 and also was Chairman of the ACT Vocational Training Authority from 1992 to 1995.

He is a member of many local community organisations. Reynolds has lived in Townsville most of his life and he graduated with a Bachelor of Social Work (B.S.W.) from James Cook University in 1978. Reynolds's active interest in politics began in the mid-1960s and he is interested in all sport, particularly rugby league, cricket, tennis and rugby union.

Reynolds was appointed a Commander of the Order of the British Empire (CBE) in the 2018 Birthday Honours, "for promoting relations between Queensland and Papua New Guinea, including as Mayor of Townsville and as Patron of YWAM Medical Ships Programme", nominated by the Papua New Guinea Government.

Reynolds is the co-author of the following books - The Great Divide: A Comparative Social Profile of Northern and Southern Australia (with D Lavery, 1997); Achieving Local Ownership of National Goals for the Coastal Zone (with L Cutts and D Osborn, 1993); Education and Training for Local Government Employees in Queensland (with V Valentine, 1992). He is also a contributor to the following books: "Local Government and the Challenge of Devolution in Australia" in Decentralization Towards Democratization and Development, (edited by RP Guzman and MA Reforma, 1993); "Recognising the Role of Local Government" in What Should Government Do? (edited by P Coaldrake and JR Nethercote, 1989).

Political offices
Preceded by Perc Tucker	Mayor of City of Townsville; 1980–1989	Succeeded by Tony Mooney
Preceded by Stephen Robertson	Queensland Minister for Emergency Services; 2001–2004	Succeeded by Chris Cummins
New title	Queensland Minister for Child Safety; 2004–2006	Succeeded by Desley Boyle
Parliament of Queensland
Preceded by Tony McGrady	Speaker of the Legislative Assembly of Queensland; 2006–2009	Succeeded by John Mickel
Preceded by Geoff Smith	Member for Townsville; 1998–2009	Succeeded by Mandy Johnstone
