= Gilroy Santa Maria College, Ingham =

School in northern Queensland, Australia

Coordinates: 18.6429°N 146.1552°E

Gilroy Santa Maria College
- Ingham, Queensland; Australia

Information
- Former names: Cardinal Gilroy College (1949–1973); Santa Maria College (1949–1973)
- Type: Private systemic secondary day school
- Motto: The spirit to achieve
- Religious affiliation: Catholicism
- Denomination: Christian Brothers (1949–1973); Sisters of Mercy (1949–1973)
- Established: 1949; 77 years ago
- Oversight: Diocese of Townsville (since 1973)
- Headmaster: John Nuttal
- Gender: Co-educational
- Enrolment: 363 (2012)

Gilroy Santa Maria College is a Catholic systemic co-educational secondary day school, located in Ingham, Queensland, Australia.

== History ==
The college is the result of a merger of two secondary Catholic schools, Cardinal Gilroy College for boys (named after Norman Gilroy, Archbishop of Sydney and operated by the Christian Brothers) and Santa Maria College for girls (operated by the Sisters of Mercy). Both colleges commenced in 1949. Changes in secondary education and the "abolition of the Scholarship year" led to the amalgamation of the two schools in 1973 on the Cardinal Gilroy College site in Chamberlain Street.

== Notable alumni ==
- David Crisafulli (born 1979), member of state parliament, and Premier of Queensland (2024–).
- Nick Dametto (born 1983), former member of state parliament (2017–2025), mayor of the City of Townsville (2025–).

== See also ==
- List of schools in North Queensland
