= List of mayors of Townsville =

Mayor of Townsville
- Incumbent; Nick Dametto since 16 November 2025
- Term length: 4 years
- Inaugural holder: John Melton Black
- Formation: 1866

This is a list of mayors of the City of Townsville, a local government area of Queensland, Australia.

Nick Dametto is the mayor-elect following the Saturday 15 November 2025 City of Townsville mayoral by-election, where he received 61.6% of the vote, with recently-resigned mayor Troy Thompson coming fifth at 4.8% of the vote (or 2080 persons). Elected in 2024, Thompson beat previous mayor Jenny Hill, who was elected in 2012 and re-elected in 2016 and 2020.

Elections for mayor are held every four years as part of the statewide local elections.

== History ==
The first mayor was John Melton Black, a pioneer who is said to have built the first house in Townsville.

In 1976, the Labor Party won control of the council, with Perc Tucker elected mayor. He served until his death in August 1980, being replaced by Mike Reynolds, who was himself succeeded by Tony Mooney in 1989.

Mooney served as mayor until the 2008 election, which was the first the original City of Townsville merged with the City of Thuringowa. Former Thuringowa mayor Les Tyrell defeated Mooney in a landslide, but only served for a single term and retired in 2012.

== Mayors ==
=== 1866–present ===
No.	Portrait	Mayor	Party	Term start	Term end	Notes	Council control (term)
1		John Melton Black (1830–1919)	Independent	1866	1867		
2		William Alfred Ross	Independent	1868	1868		
3		William Aplin (1840–1901)	Independent	1869	1869		
4		Frederick Coleman	Independent	1870	1870		
5		Patrick Hanran (1831–1916)	Independent	1871	1872		
6		S. F. Walker	Independent	1873	1873		
7		Joseph Fletcher	Independent	1874	1874		
(6)		S. F. Walker	Independent	1875	1875		
8		Henry Knapp	Independent	1876	1876	Noted as a "brief" term	
(5)		Patrick Hanran (1831–1916)	Independent	1876	1877		
9		E. A. Head	Independent	1878	1878		
(5)		Patrick Hanran (1831–1916)	Independent	1879	1879		
10		Thankful Percy Willmett	Independent	1880	1881		
(5)		Patrick Hanran (1831–1916)	Independent	1882	1882		
11		W.V. Brown	Independent	1883	1883		
(10)		Thankful Percy Willmett	Independent	1883	1884		
12		Eugene J. Forrest	Independent	1885	1885		
13		Henry Barbenson Le Touzel Hubert	Independent	1885	1885		
14		W.P. Walker	Independent	1886	1886		
15		Arthur Glennie Bundock	Independent	1887	1888		
16		John Newport Parkes	Independent	1889	1889		
17		William Clayton	Independent	1890	1890		
18		Lionel Fairley	Independent	1891	1891		
(5)		Patrick Hanran (1831–1916)	Independent	1892	1892		
19		C.F.A. Sparre	Independent	1892	1892		
(5)		Patrick Hanran (1831–1916)	Independent	1893	1893		
20		Murdo Cameron	Independent	1894	1894		
(12)		Eugene J. Forrest	Independent	1895	1895		
(5)		Patrick Hanran (1831–1916)	Independent	1896	1896		
21		Michael McKiernan	Independent	1897	1897		
22		A.E. McCreedy	Independent	1898	1898		
23		Thomas Enright	Independent	1899	1899		
(22)		A.E. McCreedy	Independent	1900	1900		
(20)		Murdo Cameron	Independent	1901	1901		
(10)		Thankful Percy Willmett	Independent	1902	1902		
24		William Archer Ackers	Independent	1903	1903		
25		Thomas Smyth	Independent	1904	1904		
(20)		Murdo Cameron	Independent	1905	1905		
26		J. Thompson	Independent	1906	1906		
27		Peter Minehan	Independent	1907	1907		
28		George Murray	Independent	1908	1908		
(25)		Thomas Smyth	Independent	1909	1909		
29		Joseph Hodel (1850–1943)	Independent	1910	1910		
(28)		George Murray	Independent	1911	1911		
30		John Henry Tyack	Independent	1912	1912		
31		Robert Wilson McClelland	Independent	1913	1913		
32		William Henry Swales	Independent	1914	1915		
(31)		Robert Wilson McClelland	Independent	1916	1916		
33		John Edward Clegg	Independent	1917	1918		
34		Thomas George Melrose	Independent	1919	1919		
35		William Green (1878–1968)	Northern Country	1920	1923		
36		Anthony Ogden (1866–1943)	Labor	1924	1926		
37		William John Heatley (1890/91−1944)	Independent	1926	8 April 1933		
38		John Stewart Mitchell	Independent	8 April 1933	1952		
39		Angus J. Smith	Independent	1952	1967		
40		Harold Phillips	Independent	1967	1972		
41		Max Hooper (1926–2000)	Independent National	1972	1976		
42		Perc Tucker (1919–1980)	Labor	1976	20 August 1980	Died in office	
43		Mike Reynolds (1946–)	Labor	20 August 1980	1989		
44		Tony Mooney	Labor	1989	15 March 2008	Lost re-election	
45		Les Tyrell	Team Tyrell	15 March 2008	28 April 2012	Mayor of Thuringowa from 1991–2008. Retired	Team Tyrell majority (2008–2012)
45		Les Tyrell	Team Tyrell	15 March 2008	28 April 2012	Mayor of Thuringowa from 1991–2008. Retired	Townsville First majority (2012–2015)
46		Jenny Hill	Team Jenny Hill	28 April 2012	16 March 2024	Also a Labor Party member. Lost re-election	Townsville First majority (2012–2015)
46		Jenny Hill	Team Jenny Hill	28 April 2012	16 March 2024	Also a Labor Party member. Lost re-election	No overall control (2015–2016)
46		Jenny Hill	Team Jenny Hill	28 April 2012	16 March 2024	Also a Labor Party member. Lost re-election	Team Jenny Hill majority (2016–2024)
47		Troy Thompson	Independent	16 March 2024	26 September 2025	Resigned	No overall control (2024–present)
48		Nick Dametto	Independent	15 November 2025		Mayor-elect Katter's Australian Party member for Hinchinbrook from 2017–2025.	No overall control (2024–present)

== Electoral results ==
=== 2025 by-election ===
2025 Townsville mayoral by-election
Party	Candidate	Votes	%	±%
Independent	Nick Dametto	62,896	61.51	+61.51
Independent	Ann-Maree Greaney	13,337	13.04	+13.04
Independent	David Kippin	7,325	7.16	+7.16
Independent Labor	Joanne Keune	5,415	5.30	+5.30
Independent	Troy Thompson	5,046	4.93	–41.67
Independent Labor	Paul Jacob	2,881	2.82	+2.82
Independent	Harry Patel	2,236	2.19	–7.55
Independent	Chris Poulsen	1,912	1.87	+1.87
Independent	Sean Gleeson (withdrawn)	1,204	1.18	+1.18
Total formal votes		102,252	98.98	+2.47
Informal votes		1,051	1.02	−2.47
Turnout		103,303	72.35	−6.86
Nick Dametto gain from Troy Thompson				

=== 2024 ===
2024 Queensland mayoral elections: Townsville
Party	Candidate	Votes	%	±%
Independent	Troy Thompson	50,167	46.60	+46.60
Team Jenny Hill	Jenny Hill	47,415	43.86	−6.78
Independent	Harry Patel	10,529	9.74	+9.74
Total formal votes		108,111	96.51	
Informal votes		3,909	3.49	
Turnout		112,020	79.21	+4.94
Two-candidate-preferred result
Independent	Troy Thompson	53,956	52.62	+52.62
Team Jenny Hill	Jenny Hill	48,575	47.38	−14.15
Independent gain from Team Jenny Hill		Swing	N/A	

=== 2020 ===
2020 Queensland mayoral elections: Townsville
Party	Candidate	Votes	%	±%
Team Jenny Hill	Jenny Hill	46,911	50.64	−8.87
Independent	Sam Cox	25,076	27.07	+27.07
It's Time for Townsville	Greg Dowling	16,155	17.44	+17.44
NQ State Alliance	Chris Eastaughffe	4,498	4.86	+4.86
Turnout		95,509	74.27	−5.78
Two-candidate-preferred result
Team Jenny Hill	Jenny Hill	49,255	61.53	−1.16
Independent	Sam Cox	30,791	38.47	+38.47
Team Jenny Hill hold		Swing	−1.16	

=== 2016 ===
2016 Queensland mayoral elections: Townsville
Party	Candidate	Votes	%	±%
Team Jenny Hill	Jenny Hill	58,862	59.51	+25.77
Jayne Arlett's Team	Jayne Arlett	34,849	35.23	+35.23
Independent	William Hankin	3,237	3.27	+3.27
Independent	Harry Patel	1,970	1.99	+0.20
Total formal votes		98,918	97.01	+0.67
Informal votes		3,207	2.99	−0.67
Turnout		101,965	80.05	
Two-candidate-preferred result
Team Jenny Hill	Jenny Hill	59,881	62.69	+11.11
Jayne Arlett's Team	Jayne Arlett	35,639	37.31	+37.31
Team Jenny Hill hold		Swing	+11.11	

=== 2012 ===
2012 Queensland mayoral elections: Townsville
Party	Candidate	Votes	%	±%
Team Jenny Hill	Jenny Hill	28,508	33.74	+33.74
Townsville First	Dale Last	26,898	31.83	+31.83
Independent	Jeff Jimmieson	15,301	18.11	+18.11
Independent	Brendan Porter	12,277	14.53	+14.53
Independent	Harry Patel	1,516	1.79	+1.79
Total formal votes		84,500	96.34	−2.37
Informal votes		3,207	3.66	+2.37
Turnout		87,707	80.05	
Two-candidate-preferred result
Team Jenny Hill	Jenny Hill	32,946	51.58	+51.58
Townsville First	Dale Last	30,928	48.42	+48.42
Team Jenny Hill gain from Team Tyrell		Swing		

- Incumbent mayor Les Tyrell (Team Tyrell) did not recontest

=== 2008 ===
2008 Queensland mayoral elections: Townsville
Party	Candidate	Votes	%	±%
Team Tyrell	Les Tyrell	47,956	54.64	+54.64
Labor	Tony Mooney	31,524	35.91	−37.65
Community Voices	Jenny Stirling	6,343	7.23	
Independent	Rolando Taviani	1,292	1.47	
Independent	Francis Pauler	660	0.75	
Total formal votes		87,775	98.71	
Informal votes		1,145	1.29	
Turnout		88,920		
Team Tyrell gain from Labor		Swing		

=== 1933 ===
1933 Queensland mayoral elections: Townsville
Party	Candidate	Votes	%	±%
Independent	John Stewart Gill		<50.0	
Labor	Anthony Ogden			
Progressive	John Edward Clegg			
Independent hold		Swing		

- Incumbent mayor William John Heatley (Independent) did not recontest
