= Nick Dametto =

Australian politician (born 1983)

Councillor Nick Dametto
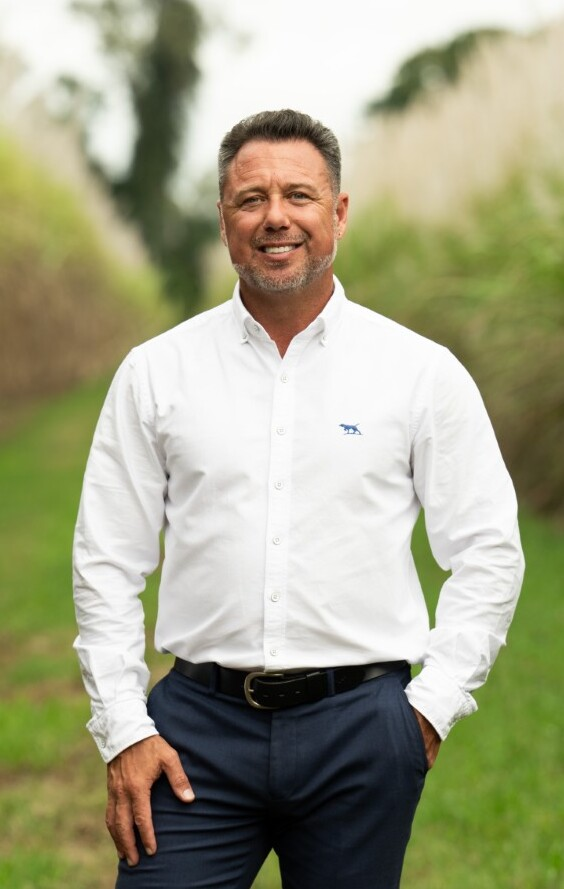

48th Mayor of Townsville
- Incumbent
- Assumed office 16 November 2025
- Preceded by: Troy Thompson

Deputy Leader of Katter's Australian Party
- In office 16 November 2021 – 14 October 2025
- Leader: Robbie Katter
- Preceded by: Position established

Member of the Queensland Legislative Assembly for Hinchinbrook
- In office 25 November 2017 – 14 October 2025
- Preceded by: Andrew Cripps
- Succeeded by: Wayde Chiesa

Personal details
- Born: 18 September 1983 (age 42) Ingham, Queensland, Australia
- Party: Independent (since 2025)
- Other political affiliations: Katter's Australian (until 2025)
- Children: At least one
- Education: Gilroy Santa Maria College, Ingham
- Occupation: Politician

Nicholas Dametto (born 18 September 1983) is an Australian politician who has served as the mayor of Townsville since 2025. He was the member for Hinchinbrook in the Queensland Legislative Assembly between 2017 and 2025, serving as the deputy leader of Katter's Australian Party (KAP) between 2021 and 2025.

== Early life ==
Dametto was born in Ingham, near Hawkins Creek on a family-owned sugar cane farm. His grandfather left Italy post-World War II, and was raised as one of several children to a single mother, in the Roman Catholic religion. from the age of 15 he worked after school at a spare parts store and Friday nights at a bakery in Ingham, and a store on Saturday. Dametto's father gave him experience on charter boats and banana crop farming. He completed his schooling at Gilroy Santa Maria College in 2000.

Dametto worked within several industries, namely tourism as the previous owner of jet ski operator Townsville WaterSports, sugar at the Victoria Mill, and mining as a diesel fitter and boilermaker nationwide.

His high school sweetheart, later wife, and he became parents at the age of 18. They have one son.

== Political career ==
At the 2017 Queensland state election, Dametto was the Katter's Australian Party (KAP) candidate for the Hinchinbrook district. He finished third on the primary vote, behind the Liberal National Party and One Nation. However, he overtook One Nation for second place on Labor preferences, and then defeated LNP incumbent Andrew Cripps on One Nation preferences. Hinchinbrook had been in the hands of the LNP or the Nationals since 1960.

In November 2021, Dametto was appointed as deputy to the party's leader Robbie Katter.

In April 2025, Dametto was given an adult caution for breach of alcohol restrictions per the Curacoa Island alcohol management plan following a Good Friday visit to the Greater Palm region.

Dametto helped organise the Townsville rally of the March for Australia, an anti-immigration rally in August 2025. Dametto was warned by a member of the crowd that there were Neo-Nazis present at the rally. Dametto defended the presence of the men and said, "Who they are I don't know, but if they can behave themselves today and don't do anything to stir anyone up, I've got no dramas with them standing and doing their own thing over there. They're Australians, I may not support what they may or may not be into but I believe that every Australian has the right to march today".

In late September 2025, Dametto stated he would resign from the Katter's Australian Party to contest the upcoming Townsville mayoral by-election as an independent, with the election to be held in November. On 2 October 2025, it was reported Dametto had already resigned from the party and would also be resigning from state parliament for the mayoral by-election. Dametto won the by-election with a primary vote of 61.53%.

Parliament of Queensland
Preceded by Andrew Cripps	Member for Hinchinbrook; 2017–2025	Succeeded by Wayde Chiesa
