= Troy Thompson (politician) =

Australian politician (born 1971)

47th Mayor of Townsville
- In office 16 March 2024 – 26 September 2025
- Preceded by: Jenny Hill
- Succeeded by: Nick Dametto

Personal details
- Born: Troy Joseph Thompson; 15 January 1971 Perth, Western Australia
- Party: Independent (since 2020)
- Other political affiliations: One Nation (until 2020)
- Spouse: Rebecca Hilston (m. 1989–1995) Joanne Birnbauer (m. 1996–2015)

Troy Joseph Thompson (né Birnbrauer; born 15 January 1971) is an Australian politician who served as the mayor of Townsville, a local government area in Queensland, from March 2024 until September 2025.

Thompson was elected at the 2024 local elections, defeating long-standing incumbent Jenny Hill. On 21 November 2024, he was suspended by the Queensland Government for 12 months with full pay. He resigned as mayor on 26 September 2025 and was unsuccessful in recontesting the position at a by-election two months later.

== Political career ==
Thompson was preselected as the One Nation candidate for Thuringowa at the 2020 Queensland state election, but was disendorsed because he did not disclose his legal name and directorship in a supply chain management company that went insolvent in 2017.

Thompson is banned from entering the Queensland Parliament House as of 2021.

In early 2024, Thompson announced his candidacy for mayor of Townsville at the upcoming Townsville local government election, running against 12-year incumbent Jenny Hill. On 27 March 2024, more than a week after the election, Hill conceded to Thompson.

In May 2024, after an interview with A Current Affair, Thompson was referred to the State's Crime and Corruption Commission regarding his military service history. In early June 2024, the Townsville City Council passed a vote of no confidence in Thompson. All of the councillors present at the sitting unilaterally passed the motion. He continued to serve in the council and disregarded continued calls for his resignation. In September 2025, the Office of the Independent Assessor reported he breached the code of conduct for sending a 2024 e-mail when seeking funding for legal advice. The council then reviewed the report.

On Friday 26 September 2025 Thompson had resigned, indicated he would contest a by-election, and stated "attempts to oust him amounted to government overreach and political interference". After the Saturday 15 November 2025 City of Townsville mayoral by-election, Nick Dametto received 61.6% of the vote, with Thompson coming fifth at 4.8% of the vote (or 2080 persons).

The Crime and Corruption Commission report of late November 2025 found the former mayor was never a Special Air Service Regiment member, that health claims of oesophageal cancer were unfounded, nor had the indicated university degrees. The report recommended laws with sanctions for candidates providing false information.

=== Military service scrutiny ===
In April 2024, Thompson was the subject of scrutiny after doubts were raised in the media about his claims of having served with the Australian Army. After he attended Townsville's Anzac Day dawn service without any medals, Thompson admitted he did not have any medals of his own. This is despite Thompson claiming he served for five years as a reservist in Australia, with the 109th Signals Squadron before serving with the Special Air Service Regiment's 152 Signal Squadron, finishing his service with the 105th Signals Squadron. (It should be noted the City of Townsville is considered a 'garrison city', home to large army and air force presences.)

When asked what his service number was, Thompson said he could not recall what it was because the only record of it was in a book where it had been noted down in handwriting in the mid-1990s. Thompson said he had asked unrelated federal MP Phillip Thompson for help in trying to locate his service number, but Phillip Thompson said he had not yet received any such request.

When asked by the Townsville Bulletin to provide evidence of the request having been submitted, Thompson said he would not be making any further comments about the issue. The Bulletin also claimed Thompson has since blocked some newspaper staff and local community leaders from his official mayoral social media channels.

In the interview with A Current Affair in May 2024, Thompson said he enlisted in the army in 1991 and served less than three years as a reservist, largely in the Catering Corps.

The matter of his service history has been referred to the State's Crime and Corruption Commission. Separately the Queensland State Department of Local Government asked the State Office of the Independent Assessor to investigate the councillor's conduct.

=== Tertiary qualifications statement ===
Following election as mayor, during the A Current Affair television interview, Thompson admitted information on his LinkedIn profile was incorrect; that he did not have bachelor degrees in science and commerce from Griffith and Curtin universities.

== Personal life ==
Born in Western Australia, where his father served with the Australian Army, Thompson commenced schooling in Townsville in 1978, completing in 1988 at Kirwan State High School.

Thompson had been previously known as Troy Joseph Birnbrauer, after he married a German woman in 1996 and took her surname "as she was last in her [family] line".

== See also ==
- Military impostor
