= State of North Queensland =

Proposed state of Australia

North Queensland Capricornia
- Proposed Australian state
- State of North Queensland; State of Capricornia
- Flag
- Interactive map of North Queensland; Capricornia
- Country: Australia
- Capital: Townsville or Cairns
- Largest city: Townsville
- Demonym(s): North Queenslander; Capricornian
- Government: Federated parliamentary constitutional monarchy

Population
  - Estimate: 785,890 (6th)

North Queensland or Capricornia is a proposed state of Australia, to be formed from part of the current state of Queensland. The proposal does not have the support of the two major political parties that dominate politics in Queensland, though it has been advocated by Katter's Australian Party (KAP), a minor party with a large presence in North Queensland.

== History ==
Under the section 124 of the Constitution of Australia, new states may be created from an existing state with the consent of that state's parliament.

In 1852, John Dunmore Lang proposed – in his book Freedom and Independence for the Golden Lands of Australia – the division of the future colony of Queensland into three subdivisions.

Queensland with the 22nd parallel south running through it, indicating the proposed state of North Queensland.

A committee of businessmen in Townsville first pushed for a separate state in July 1882.

The separatist movement in North Queensland was fostered by the sugar planters, who saw the existence of the sugar industry threatened by the "abolitionist" movement in South Queensland for the suppression of Kanaka labour. One proposal is that Queensland should be divided by the 22nd parallel south with the boundary running just south of Sarina on the coast to the Northern Territory border between Boulia and Mount Isa.

According to The Courier-Mail in 2010, the majority of North Queensland mayors were in favour of the separation from Queensland proper. Only two of the 100 delegates at the NQ Local Government Association meeting were against the proposal – the two being Mayor Val Schier (Cairns) and Mayor Ben Callcott (Charters Towers).

In 2013, social demographer Bernard Salt said that Townsville would go from regional powerhouse to metropolitan city by 2026, and that there are fewer people living in the state of Tasmania than in North Queensland.

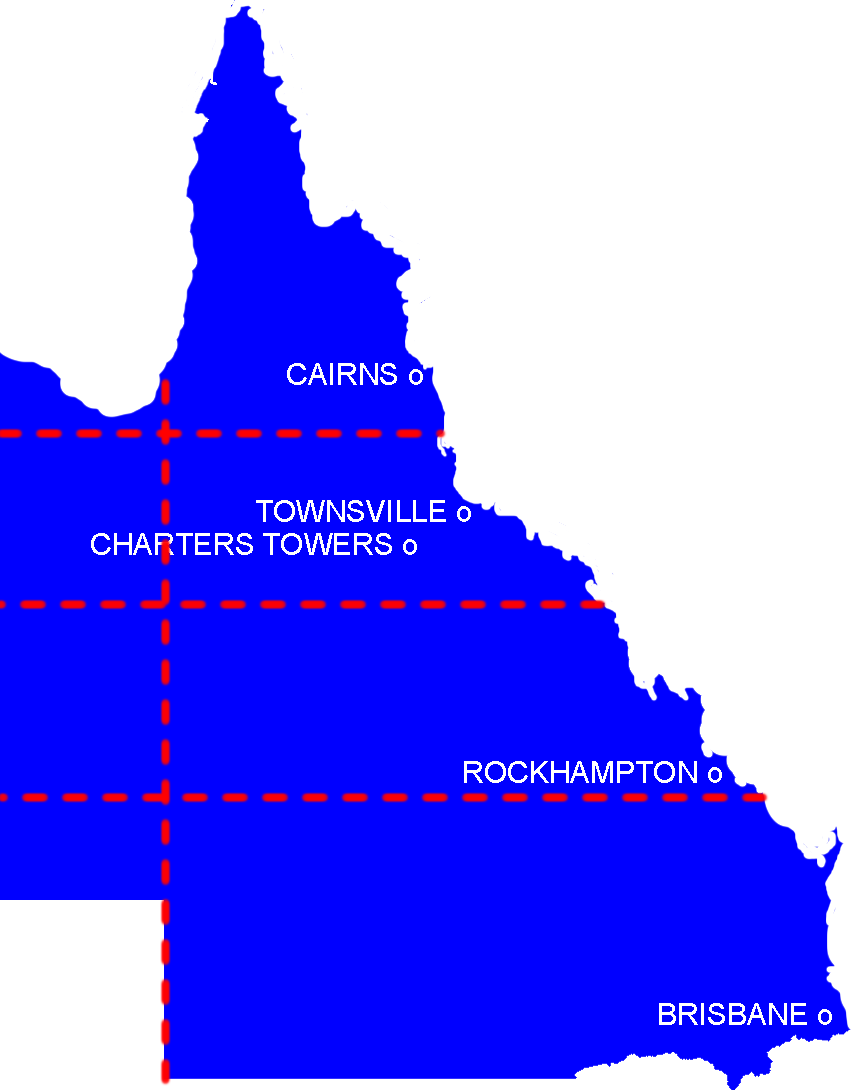
Various other lines dividing Queensland

Supporters of the North Queensland state include Geoffrey Blainey, and Member of Parliament Bob Katter and former member Clive Palmer.

One of many proposals stated that North Queensland would contain 785,890 people, ranking slightly above that of Tasmania, although lower than that of South Australia. In area, it would be 735,300 square kilometres, ranking between New South Wales and Victoria, and bringing Queensland down to the third largest state/territory in Australia.

In the election periods of September 2016 and also October 2020 Katter's Australian Party sought to split Queensland into two states. It was also in 2016 the Liberal National Party state convention voted down a motion to hold a referendum at a state convention.

MP Bill Byrne believes that a North Queensland state would not be economically viable, as mining royalties are only a modest portion of the entire Queensland state budget (only $2–3 billion of $50 billion state budget), while costs for delivering power would be much higher without money from South East Queensland consumers.

On 22 May 2024 Robbie Katter introduced a motion in the Queensland Parliament that would separate North Queensland from the rest of the state, and called for a referendum to be held in the North to allow residents to have their say on the matter. Katter claimed that the region was being neglected by the state's South East, particularly in the areas of investment, infrastructure and disaster relief. The motion was ultimately resolved in the negative under standing order 106(10).

== Proposed flags ==
Proposed flag designed by Edward Cattoni in 1980, and approved at a meeting of the North Queensland State Party on 16 October 1994.

Proposed flag for Capricornia (which has been suggested as an alternate name for a separate North Queensland state), designed by Ian Johnston in 2004.

Proposed flag designed by Bob Katter MP in 2020.

== Cities and towns ==
No.	City	Population	LGA	Region
1	Townsville	192,768	City of Townsville	North Queensland
2	Cairns	169,312	Cairns Region	Far North Queensland
3	Mackay	80,148	Mackay Region	North Queensland
4	Atherton Tablelands	26,244	Tablelands Region	Far North Queensland
5	Mount Isa	18,588	City of Mount Isa	North Queensland
6	Ayr-Home Hill	16,692	Shire of Burdekin	North Queensland
7	Airlie Beach-Cannonvale	16,280	Whitsunday Region	North Queensland
8	Mareeba	11,825	Shire of Mareeba	Far North Queensland
9	Bowen	9,612	Whitsunday Region	North Queensland
10	Moranbah	8,899	Isaac Region	North Queensland
11	Charters Towers	8,040	Charters Towers Region	North Queensland
12	Innisfail	7,173	Cassowary Coast Region	Far North Queensland
13	Port Douglas-Mossman	6,368	Shire of Douglas	Far North Queensland
14	Ingham	4,334	Shire of Hinchinbrook	North Queensland

== North Queensland State Alliance ==
North Queensland State Alliance
- Abbreviation: NQSA, NQSP
- President: Henry Fracchia
- Founder: Peter Raffles
- Founded: 2 June 2018
- Headquarters: North Queensland
- Ideology: North Queensland statehood

The North Queensland State Alliance (NQSA), also known as the North Queensland State Party (NQSP), is an Australian political party founded in support of the creation of a State of North Queensland.

The party was founded in June 2018 by Peter Raffles, who announced that the party planned to contest the October 2020 Queensland state election, although this did not eventuate.

At the March 2020 local government elections, the NQSA ran two separate party tickets − Cairns N.Q.S.A. Team (5,775 votes) and TSV Team NQ State Alliance (6,694 votes). No candidates from either ticket were elected.

In 2021, NQSA candidate Fran O'Callaghan was elected to Townsville City Council in a by-election for Division 10. She did not contest the 2024 election, leaving NQSA without any elected representatives.

== Other organisations in favour ==
- Katter's Australian Party (2011–present)
- North Queensland First (2019–2021)

== Politics ==
North Queensland is home to a large number of electorates at both a state and federal level. North Queensland federal seats include, or partially include as of 2025

- Leichhardt (Labor Party Held),
- Kennedy (Katters Australia Party Held),
- Dawson (Liberal National Held),
- Herbert (Liberal National Held).

State seats include, or partially include as of 2025

- Burdekin (LNP held)
- Hinchinbrook (LNP held)
- Traeger (KAP held)
- Mackay (LNP held)
- Mundingburra (LNP held)
- Thuringowa (LNP held)
- Townsville (LNP held)
- Whitsunday (LNP held)
- Barron River (LNP held)
- Cairns (ALP held)
- Cook (LNP held)
- Hill (KAP held)
- Mulgrave (LNP held)

== See also ==
- Central Queensland Territorial Separation League
- Regionalism
- Separatism
- Politics of Queensland
