= Les Tyrell =

Australian local government politician

45th Mayor of Townsville
- In office 15 March 2008 – 28 April 2012
- Preceded by: Tony Mooney
- Succeeded by: Jenny Hill

Personal details
- Party: Team Tyrell
- Other political affiliations: Liberal (until 2008); Liberal National (since 2008)
- Spouse: Pat Tyrell
- Children: 7

Les Tyrell is an Australian local government politician. He was the Mayor of the City of Townsville from 2008 until his retirement in 2012. He previously served as Mayor of the City of Thuringowa from 1991 until it became part of the City of Townsville in March 2008. He became mayor of the new larger City of Townsville after an upset victory over Tony Mooney, who had been Mayor of Townsville for twenty years until the amalgamation.

== Personal ==
Tyrell is married and has seven children (six sons and one daughter). Before moving to Thuringowa, he had lived in Wangan, Tully, Ingham, Innisfail and Cairns.

Before entering into local government, Les Tyrell was a self-employed Financial Services consultant where he dealt in investment, insurance and finance. He also has years of experience in management and sales from when he worked in the hardware and timber industries.

== Political career ==
Tyrell was first elected to the Thuringowa Shire in 1979. In 1986 the shire was proclaimed a city and in 1991 he became mayor of the City of Thuringowa when he defeated Dan Gleeson. In the 2008 election following the amalgamation of the two cities, he became Mayor of the City of Townsville after he defeated Tony Mooney. Tyrell also ran as an unsuccessful Liberal candidate for the seat of Townsville in the Legislative Assembly of Queensland, at the 1983 election.
