= Tony Mooney =

Australian politician

Tony Mooney AM
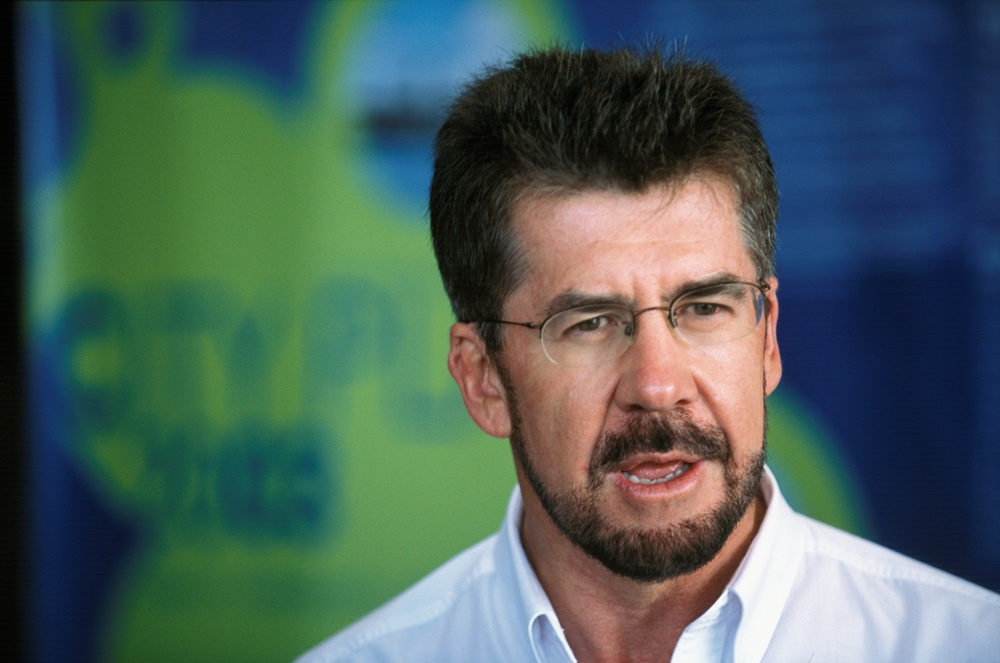
- Born: Brisbane
- Occupation: Politician
- Term: 1989–2008
- Political party: Labor Party
- Spouse: Cecilia Mooney
- Children: 3

Anthony John Mooney AM is an Australian former politician who served as a city councillor of the City of Townsville, Queensland from 1977 to 2008, and the mayor from 1989 to 2008.

== Political career ==
Cr. Tony Mooney was first elected as mayor in 1989 when he succeeded Mike Reynolds. He achieved 80% two party preferred and 73.56% primary vote at the 2004 election. Mooney was serving his sixth successive term when he was resoundingly defeated in the 2008 election with only 35% of the vote. He and former Thuringowa mayor Les Tyrell were forced to go head to head for the top position when Townsville and Thuringowa City Councils were amalgamated by the state government.

In 2008, he was appointed to the board of Ergon Energy and in 2009 to the board of Townsville Enterprise Limited.

As an ALP candidate, he made two attempts to win a parliamentary seat but both attempts were unsuccessful. The first was as the ALP candidate for the court ordered Queensland state Mundingburra by-election. He was endorsed as the ALP candidate in Mundingburra after the ALP Administrative Committee disendorsed the sitting member Ken Davies. Mooney was defeated in the by-election thanks in some part to Davies running as an independent. Mooney won 40.2% of the primary vote and 47.2% of the two party preferred vote while Davies won 4.1% of the primary vote but did not direct his preferences to Mooney. It has been noted that it was enough to cost Mooney victory at the by-election. Mooney's second attempt to win a parliamentary seat was in 2010 when he announced his candidacy for the Federal seat of Herbert, but he was defeated by Ewen Jones at the Federal election on 21 August 2010.

== Education ==
Mooney received a scholarship to study at James Cook University in 1972 and completed an honours degree in education- arts. He is a Fellow of the Australian Institute of Company Directors.

== Honours ==
Mooney received the Centenary Medal on 1 January 2001 for distinguished service to local government.

On 26 January 2011, Mooney was appointed a Member of the Order of Australia for service to local government, and to the community of Townsville through a range of tourism, business and infrastructure organisations.
