= Jenny Hill (politician) =

Australian politician

Jenny Hill AM
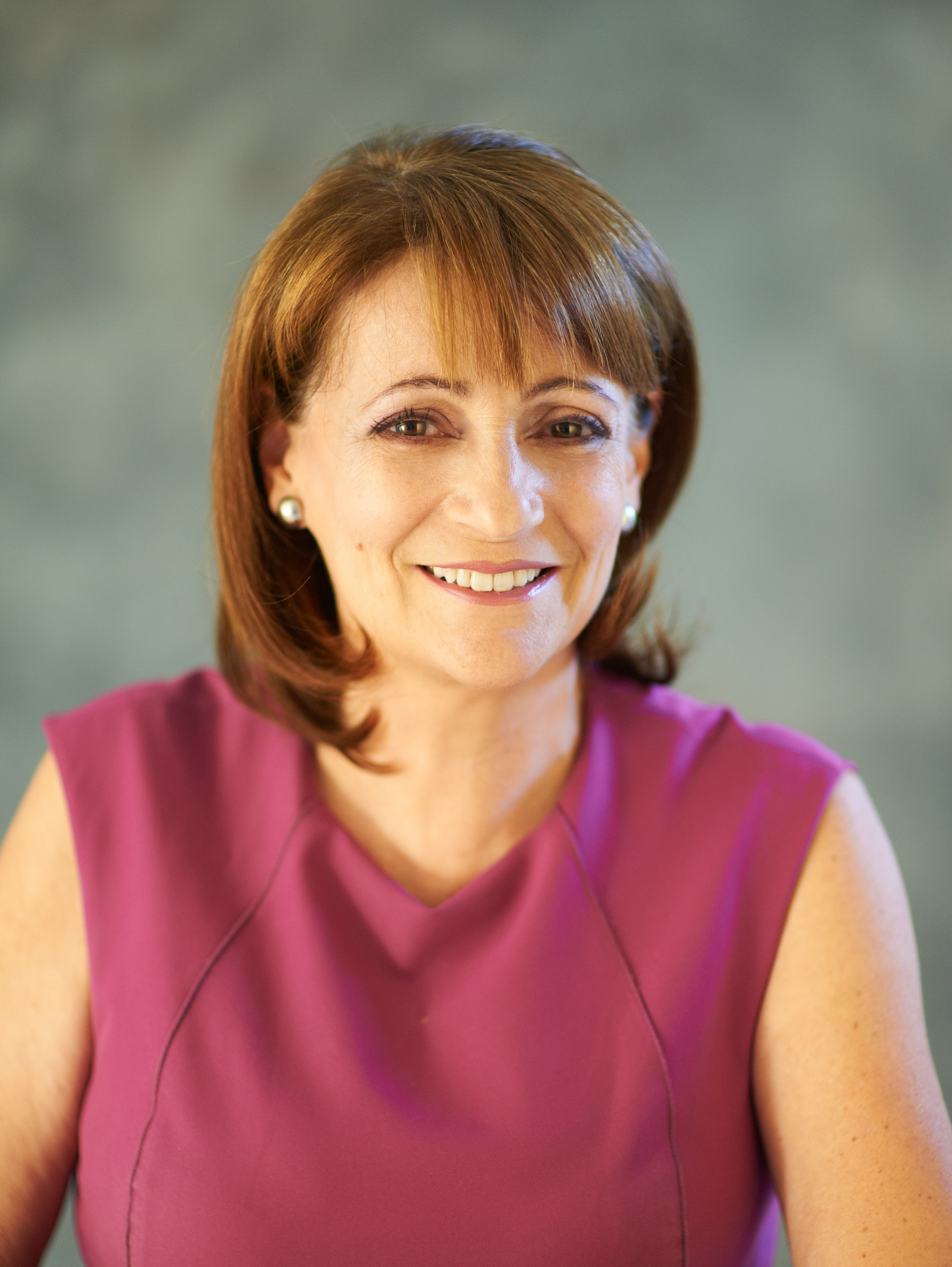

46th Mayor of Townsville
- In office 28 April 2012 – 16 March 2024
- Deputy: Les Walker; Mark Molachino
- Preceded by: Les Tyrell
- Succeeded by: Troy Thompson

Personal details
- Born: Jennifer Lorraine Hill Melbourne, Victoria
- Party: Labor (since 1985)
- Other political affiliations: Team Jenny Hill (since 2012)
- Education: La Trobe University; James Cook University
- Occupation: Microbiologist

Military service
- Allegiance: Australia
- Branch/service: Australian Army Reserve; Royal Australian Electrical and Mechanical Engineers

Jennifer Lorraine Hill AM is an Australian former politician who served as mayor of Townsville from 2012 until 2024. which is the 18th largest local government area in Australia. She was elected to the position during the Queensland Local Government elections held on 28 April 2012. Prior to serving as mayor, Hill was a city councillor and previously held the position of Deputy Mayor under the previous pre-amalgamation Townsville City Council in the Labor administration of Tony Mooney between 2007 and 2008.

Hill came to Townsville as the fiancée of a soldier in 1982. She worked as a scientist, and later received a master's degree in public health.

== Political career ==
=== Local government ===
She was first elected to the Townsville City Council in 1997. She is a member of the Labor Party.

Hill also ran as the Labor Party candidate for the federal seat of Herbert in the 2001 federal election. She was defeated by the then incumbent Liberal member, Peter Lindsay.

In 2020, Hill was charged with driving without due care and attention causing death following a fatal collision with a motorcycle on 30 January 2020. She was found not guilty in August 2021. The court heard that the motorcyclist was on methamphetamine at the time, ran a red light, and was driving above the legal speed limit at the time of the crash.

On 27 March, more than a week after the 2024 local government elections, Hill conceded to Troy Thompson, ending her 12-year tenure as mayor. She has stated she does not plan to contest politics in the future.

=== Federal politics ===
On 13 May 2024, it was revealed that Hill was seeking to move to federal politics, having nominated for preselection to the second position on the Labor Senate ticket at the 2025 federal election.
