= City of Townsville =

Coordinates: 19°15′27.50″S 146°49′04.45″E

- Local government area
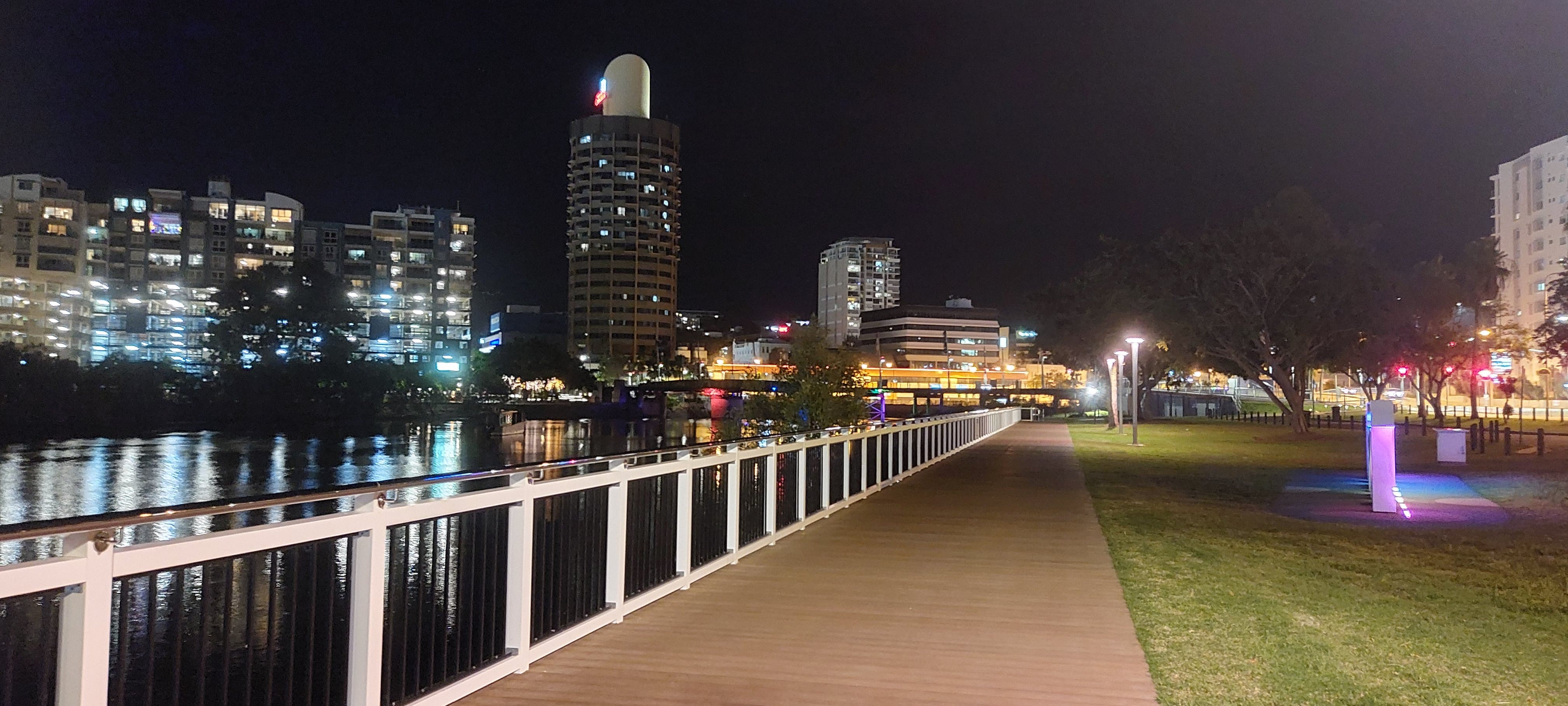
- Townsville Skyline

- Interactive map of City of Townsville
- Country: Australia
- State: Queensland
- Region: North Queensland
- Established: 1865
- Council seat: Townsville City

Government
  - Mayor: Nick Dametto
  - State electorates: Townsville; Thuringowa; Mundingburra; Burdekin; Hinchinbrook
  - Federal divisions: Herbert; Dawson; Kennedy

Area
  - Total: 3,731 km^{2} (1,441 sq mi)

Population
  - Total: 192,768 (2021 census) (28th)
  - Density: 51.667/km^{2} (133.816/sq mi)
- Website: City of Townsville
LGAs around City of Townsville
Hinchinbrook	Coral Sea	Coral Sea
Charters Towers	City of Townsville	Burdekin
Charters Towers	Charters Towers	Burdekin

The City of Townsville is a local government area (LGA) located in North Queensland, Australia. It encompasses the city of Townsville, together with the surrounding rural areas. To the south are the communities of Alligator Creek, Woodstock and Reid River, and to the north are Northern Beaches and Paluma. Also included is Magnetic Island. In June 2018 the area had a population of 194,072, and is the 28th-largest LGA in Australia. Townsville is considered to be the unofficial capital of North Queensland.

In the 2021 census, the City of Townsville had a population of 192,768 people.

== History ==
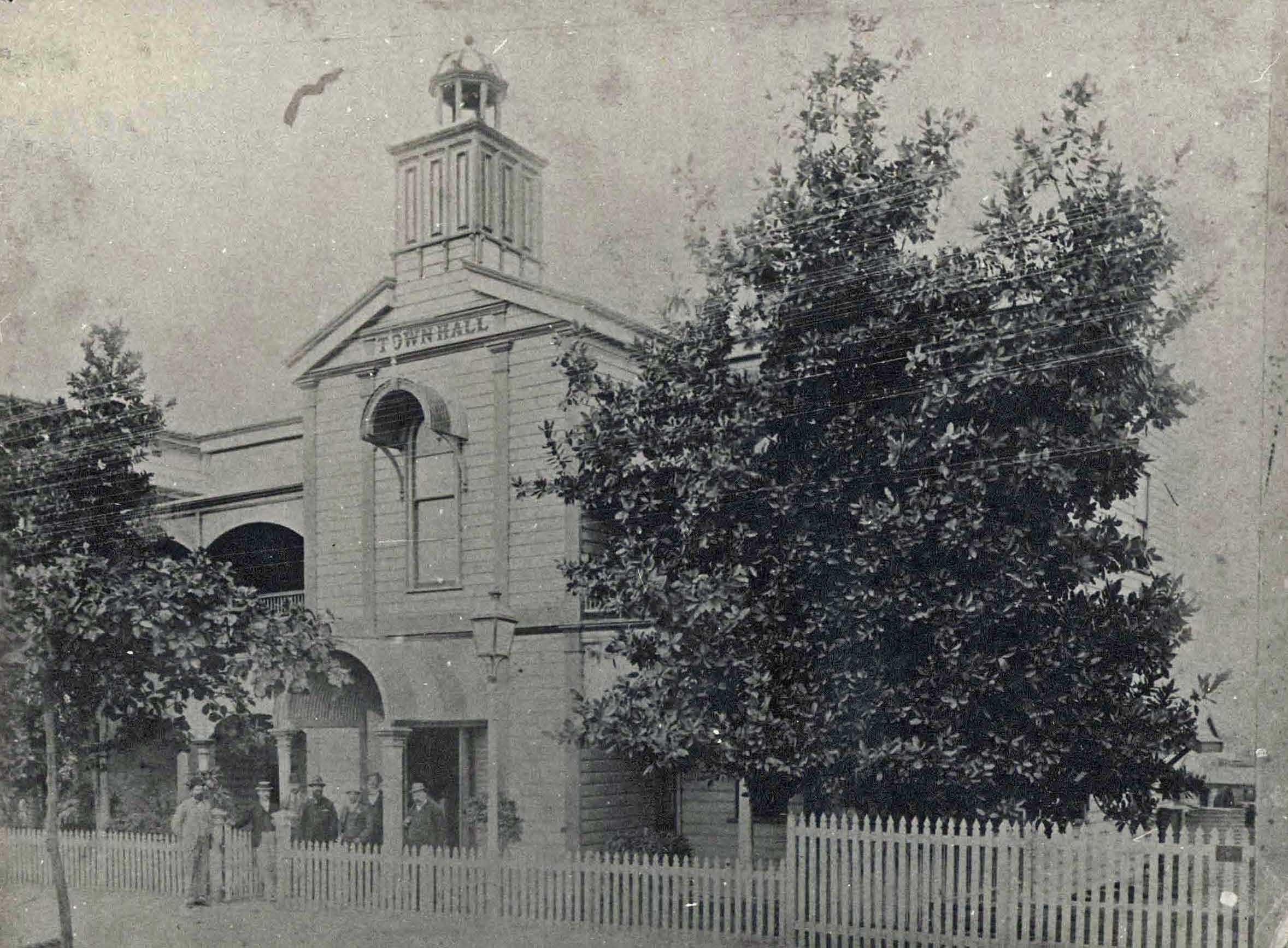
Townsville's Town Hall 1895 with, from left to right, Aldermen T. Enright, E.J. Forrest, D.F. Treehy (Townclerk), P. Lillis (Rate Receiver), J. N. Parkes, B.P. McDougall (Accountant)

Prior to 2008, the new City of Townsville was an entire area of two previous and distinct local government areas:

- the former City of Townsville;
- and the City of Thuringowa.

The City of Townsville was first established as the Borough of Townsville under the Municipal Institutions Act 1864 on 15 February 1866. The surrounding rural area, which was given the name Thuringowa Division, was established on 11 November 1879 as one of 74 divisions around Queensland under the Divisional Boards Act 1879. On 31 March 1903, Thuringowa Division became the Shire of Thuringowa and Townsville was granted city status under the Local Authorities Act 1902, the ancestor of the current Local Government Act 1993.

The borders of the Townsville municipality were expanded to keep pace with urban growth in 1882, 1918, 1936, 1958 and 1964 – the purpose of expanding the borders was to keep urban and rural administrations separate. This state government convention changed under the Bjelke-Petersen government and the borders between the two local governments became static. By 1986 the Shire of Thuringowa had grown to a population of 27,000 and was declared a city.

The City of Townsville was notable in Australia in the 1890s and early 1900s for its support for municipal socialism. The anarchist and socialist Alderman Ned Lowry advocated for the City of Townsville to control various industries.

In 1939, Fred Paterson stood successfully as an alderman for the Townsville City Council, becoming the first member of the Communist Party to win such an office in Australia. He was then re-elected in 1943. The same year, he stood for the federal seat of Herbert, but was narrowly defeated. He then contested and won the Bowen seat in the Queensland Parliament, holding it from 1944 until 1950.

From 1942 to 1949, the council was held by a majority of members of the pro-soviet Labor party split, the North Queensland Labor Party.

A succession of endorsed Labor Party mayors and majority councillors held a continuous civic government from 1976–2008. This was the longest continuous Labor administration in the country until Tony Mooney was defeated in 2008.

Following local government reform undertaken by the State Government of Queensland, the City of Townsville and the City of Thuringowa were amalgamated in 2008. The process of amalgamation was completed on the election of a new combined council on 15 March 2008.

== Mayors ==
Other notable aldermen include:

- 1936–1949 (deputy mayor 1939–1944) Tom Aikens, Member of the Queensland Legislative Assembly for Mundingburra and Townsville South

== Council ==
Townsville City Council

Leadership
- Mayor: Nick Dametto, Independent

Structure
- Seats: 11 elected representatives, including a Mayor and 10 councillors
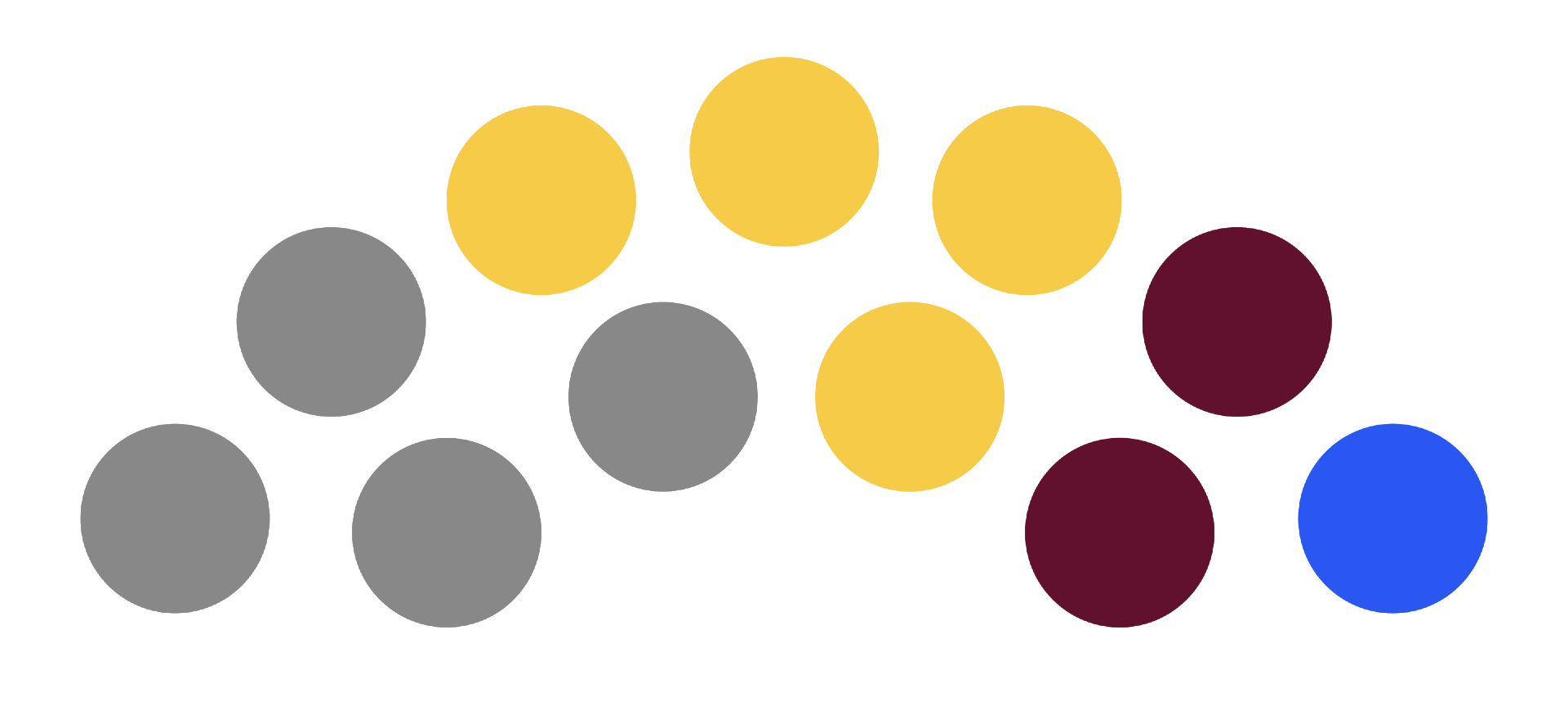
- Political groups: Independents (4); Team Jenny Hill (4); TownsvilleCHANGE (2); Independent LNP (1)

Elections
- Last election: 16 March 2024
- Next election: 25 March 2028

Townsville City Council services the LGA. The council is represented by 10 councillors and the mayor, who have been elected by the whole city. The current mayor is Nick Dametto.

The council consists of one mayor, elected at large, and 10 councillors, elected from 10 individual divisions.

=== Recent history (2008−present) ===
In 2008, the Australian Labor Party, which had controlled the council for 32 years − the longest-serving Labor administration in Australia − was defeated in a landslide by the conservative Team Tyrell, which won all but one of the councillor positions. Incumbent mayor Tony Mooney was among the ALP members defeated.

After one term, mayor Les Tyrell chose to retire from politics and did not recontest his position. At the 2012 election, councillor Dale Last ran for mayor and formed the Townsville First group, which ran candidates − including six Team Tyrell councillors − in all wards. Jenny Hill, the only sitting Labor member on council, formed Team Jenny Hill and successfully ran for mayor.

At the 2016 election, Team Jenny Hill defeated Jayne Arlett's Team in a landslide victory, picking up every single ward, along with retaining the mayoralty.

=== Current composition ===
The current council, elected in 2024, is:

Ward	Councillor	Party	Notes
Mayor	Nick Dametto	Independent	From mayoral by-election on Saturday 15 November 2025, received 62% of the vote.
Division 1	Paul Jacob	TownsvilleCHANGE	
Division 2	Brodie Phillips	Independent	
Division 3	Ann-Maree Greaney	Team Jenny Hill	
Division 4	Kristian Price	Independent	
Division 5	Vera Dirou	TownsvilleCHANGE	
Division 6	Suzy Batkovic	Team Jenny Hill	
Division 7	Kurt Rehbein	Team Jenny Hill	
Division 8	Andrew Robinson	Independent	
Division 9	Liam Mooney	Team Jenny Hill	
Division 10	Brady Ellis	Independent LNP	

== Past councillors ==
=== 2008−2012 (unsubdivided) ===
Year	Councillor	Councillor	Councillor	Councillor	Councillor	Councillor	Councillor	Councillor	Councillor	Councillor	Councillor	Councillor
2008	David Crisafulli (Team Tyrell)	Jenny Lane (Team Tyrell/TF)	Dale Last (Team Tyrell/TF)	Rob McCahill (Team Tyrell)	Ray Gartrell (Team Tyrell/TF)	Deanne Bell (Team Tyrell)	Sue Blom (Team Tyrell/TF)	Brian Hewett (Team Tyrell)	Vern Veitch (Team Tyrell/TF)	Jenny Hill (Labor/TJH)	Tony Parsons (Team Tyrell/TF)	Natalie Marr (Team Tyrell/TF)
2008	David Crisafulli (Team Tyrell)	Jenny Lane (Team Tyrell/TF)	Dale Last (Team Tyrell/TF)	Trevor Roberts (Ind./TF)	Ray Gartrell (Team Tyrell/TF)	Deanne Bell (Team Tyrell)	Sue Blom (Team Tyrell/TF)	Brian Hewett (Team Tyrell)	Vern Veitch (Team Tyrell/TF)	Jenny Hill (Labor/TJH)	Tony Parsons (Team Tyrell/TF)	Natalie Marr (Team Tyrell/TF)
2012	Vacant	Jenny Lane (Team Tyrell/TF)	Dale Last (Team Tyrell/TF)	Trevor Roberts (Ind./TF)	Ray Gartrell (Team Tyrell/TF)	Deanne Bell (Team Tyrell)	Sue Blom (Team Tyrell/TF)	Brian Hewett (Team Tyrell)	Vern Veitch (Team Tyrell/TF)	Jenny Hill (Labor/TJH)	Tony Parsons (Team Tyrell/TF)	Natalie Marr (Team Tyrell/TF)

=== 2012−present (10 wards) ===
Year	Division 1	Division 2	Division 3	Division 4	Division 5	Division 6	Division 7	Division 8	Division 9	Division 10
Year	Councillor	Councillor	Councillor	Councillor	Councillor	Councillor	Councillor	Councillor	Councillor	Councillor
2012	Sue Blom (TF/JAT)	Tony Parsons (TF/JAT)	Vern Veitch (TF/Ind.)	Jenny Lane (TF)	Pat Ernst (Ind.)	Trevor Roberts (TF/JAT)	Gary Eddiehausen (TF/JAT)	Ray Gartrell (TF/JAT)	Colleen Doyle (TJH)	Les Walker (TJH)
2015	Sue Blom (TF/JAT)	Tony Parsons (TF/JAT)	Vern Veitch (TF/Ind.)	Jenny Lane (TF)	Pat Ernst (Ind.)	Trevor Roberts (TF/JAT)	Gary Eddiehausen (TF/JAT)	Ray Gartrell (TF/JAT)	Colleen Doyle (TJH)	Les Walker (TJH)
2016	Margie Ryder (TJH)	Paul Jacob (TJH/Ind.)	Ann-Maree Greaney (TJH)	Mark Molachino (TJH)	Russ Cook (TJH)	Verena Coombe (TJH)	Kurt Rehbein (TJH)	Maurie Soars (TJH)	Colleen Doyle (TJH)	Les Walker (TJH)
2019	Margie Ryder (TJH)	Paul Jacob (TJH/Ind.)	Ann-Maree Greaney (TJH)	Mark Molachino (TJH)	Russ Cook (TJH)	Verena Coombe (TJH)	Kurt Rehbein (TJH)	Maurie Soars (TJH)	Colleen Doyle (TJH)	Les Walker (TJH)
2020	Margie Ryder (TJH)	Sue Blom (Ind.)	Ann-Maree Greaney (TJH)	Mark Molachino (TJH)	Russ Cook (TJH)	Suzy Batkovic (TJH)	Kurt Rehbein (TJH)	Maurie Soars (TJH)	Liam Mooney (TJH)	Les Walker (TJH)
2021	Margie Ryder (TJH)	Sue Blom (Ind.)	Ann-Maree Greaney (TJH)	Mark Molachino (TJH)	Russ Cook (TJH)	Suzy Batkovic (TJH)	Kurt Rehbein (TJH)	Maurie Soars (TJH)	Liam Mooney (TJH)	Fran O'Callaghan (NQSA)
2024	Paul Jacob (Change)	Brodie Phillips (Ind.)	Ann-Maree Greaney (TJH)	Kristian Price (Ind.)	Vera Dirou (Change)	Suzy Batkovic (TJH)	Kurt Rehbein (TJH)	Andrew Robinson (Ind.)	Liam Mooney (TJH)	Brady Ellis (Ind. LNP)

== Demographics ==
The populations given relate to the component entities prior to 2008. The 2011 census was the first for the new City.

Year	Population (City total)	Population (Townsville)	Population (Thuringowa)
1911	15,731	10,636	5,095
1921	23,690	21,353	2,337
1933	29,300	25,876	3,424
1947	36,436	34,109	2,327
1954	43,098	40,471	2,627
1961	53,715	51,143	2,572
1966	65,303	62,403	2,900
1971	72,023	68,591	3,432
1976	91,279	80,365	10,914
1981	98,900	81,172	17,728
1986	112,917	82,809	30,108
1991	125,010	87,288	37,722
1996	131,371	87,052	44,319
2001	143,841	92,701	51,140
2006	158,647	99,483	59,164
2011	174,462		
2016	186,757		
2021	192,768		

== Amenities ==
The Townsville City Council operates libraries at Aitkenvale, Townsville City and Thuringowa Central. It also operates a mobile library service, serving the following suburbs on a regular schedule: Burdell, Bluewater, Deeragun, Elliot Springs (Julago), Nelly Bay (Magnetic Island), Rollingstone, Saunders Beach, and Woodstock.

== Sister cities ==
- Port Moresby, Papua New Guinea since 1983
- Shunan, Japan since 1990
- Iwaki City, Japan since August 1991
- Changshu, People's Republic of China since 1995
- Suwon, South Korea since 1996
- Foshan, People's Republic of China since 2006

== See also ==
- List of tautological place names
