= Electoral results for the district of Townsville =

Queensland, Australia, district election results

This is a list of electoral results for the electoral district of Townsville in Queensland state elections.

== Members for Townsville ==
First incarnation (1878–1885, 1 member)
Member	Party	Term
John Deane	Unaligned	1878–1879
John Murtagh Macrossan	Unaligned	1879–1885
Second incarnation (1885–1912, 2 members)
Member	Party	Term
John Murtagh Macrossan	Unaligned	1885–1891
William Villiers Brown	Unaligned	1885–1888
Robert Philp	Opposition/Ministerialist	1888–1912
William Villiers Brown	Unaligned	1891–1893
George Burns	Ministerialist	1893
Anthony Ogden	Labor	1894–1896
William Castling	Ministerialist	1896–1899
Patrick Hanran	Ministerialist	1899–1909
Thomas Foley	Labor	1909–1912
Third incarnation (1912–1960, 1 member)
Member	Party	Term
Robert Philp	Opposition/Ministerialist	1912–1915
Daniel Ryan	Labor	1915–1920
William Green	Northern Country	1920–1923
Maurice Hynes	Labor	1923–1939
George Keyatta	Labor	1939–1960
Fourth incarnation (1972–present, 1 member)
Member	Party	Term
Norman Scott-Young	Liberal	1972–1983
Ken McElligott	Labor	1983–1986
Tony Burreket	National	1986–1989
Ken Davies	Labor	1989–1992
Geoff Smith	Labor	1992–1998
Mike Reynolds	Labor	1998–2009
Mandy Johnstone	Labor	2009–2012
John Hathaway	Liberal National	2012–2015
Scott Stewart	Labor	2015–2024
Adam Baillie	Liberal National	2024–present

== Election results ==
=== Elections in the 2020s ===
2024 Queensland state election: Townsville
Party	Candidate	Votes	%	±%
Liberal National	Adam Baillie	12,346	41.24	+7.79
Labor	Scott Stewart	8,921	29.80	−6.40
Katter's Australian	Margie Ryder	3,770	12.59	+1.02
Greens	Benjamin Tiley	2,428	8.11	−0.21
One Nation	Alan Butt	1,222	4.08	−0.47
Independent	Wesley Newman	744	2.49	+2.49
Family First	William Tento	505	1.69	+1.69
Total formal votes		29,936	95.86	+0.82
Informal votes		1,294	4.14	−0.82
Turnout		31,230	82.46	−2.18
Two-party-preferred result
Liberal National	Adam Baillie	16,644	55.60	+8.72
Labor	Scott Stewart	13,292	44.40	−8.72
Liberal National gain from Labor		Swing	+8.72	

2020 Queensland state election: Townsville
Party	Candidate	Votes	%	±%
Labor	Scott Stewart	10,289	36.20	+2.62
Liberal National	John Hathaway	9,508	33.45	+2.53
Katter's Australian	Joshua Schwarz	3,204	11.27	+11.27
Greens	Tom O'Grady	2,366	8.32	−2.53
One Nation	Clive Clarkson	1,293	4.55	−15.37
Animal Justice	Samara Grumberg	554	1.95	+1.95
Informed Medical Options	Toni McMahon	534	1.88	+1.88
United Australia	Greg Dowling	520	1.83	+1.83
NQ First	Clynton Hawks	157	0.55	+0.55
Total formal votes		28,425	95.04	−1.03
Informal votes		1,484	4.96	+1.03
Turnout		29,909	84.64	+0.70
Two-party-preferred result
Labor	Scott Stewart	15,099	53.12	+2.74
Liberal National	John Hathaway	13,326	46.88	−2.74
Labor hold		Swing	+2.74	

=== Elections in the 2010s ===
2017 Queensland state election: Townsville
Party	Candidate	Votes	%	±%
Labor	Scott Stewart	9,457	33.6	−6.5
Liberal National	Casie Scott	8,709	30.9	−5.1
One Nation	Allan Evans	5,611	19.9	+16.1
Greens	Rebecca Ryan	3,057	10.9	+2.5
Independent	Lindy Collins	1,330	4.7	+4.7
Total formal votes		28,164	96.1	−1.8
Informal votes		1,153	3.9	+1.8
Turnout		29,317	83.9	−1.8
Two-party-preferred result
Labor	Scott Stewart	14,189	50.4	−5.3
Liberal National	Casie Scott	13,975	49.6	+5.3
Labor hold		Swing	−5.3	

2015 Queensland state election: Townsville
Party	Candidate	Votes	%	±%
Labor	Scott Stewart	11,267	40.06	+10.79
Liberal National	John Hathaway	10,130	36.02	−2.62
Palmer United	Alan Birrell	2,697	9.59	+9.59
Greens	Gail Hamilton	2,356	8.38	+0.70
One Nation	Leanne Rissman	1,079	3.84	+3.84
Family First	Michael Punshon	596	2.12	−0.48
Total formal votes		28,125	97.87	+0.11
Informal votes		613	2.13	−0.11
Turnout		28,738	87.12	−0.38
Two-party-preferred result
Labor	Scott Stewart	14,280	55.69	+10.52
Liberal National	John Hathaway	11,360	44.31	−10.52
Labor gain from Liberal National		Swing	+10.52	

2012 Queensland state election: Townsville
Party	Candidate	Votes	%	±%
Liberal National	John Hathaway	10,011	38.63	−0.69
Labor	Mandy Johnstone	7,585	29.27	−15.10
Katter's Australian	Ray Grigg	5,654	21.82	+21.82
Greens	Jenny Stirling	1,988	7.67	−2.84
Family First	Michael Punshon	674	2.60	+0.22
Total formal votes		25,912	97.76	+0.20
Informal votes		595	2.24	−0.20
Turnout		26,507	87.50	+0.71
Two-party-preferred result
Liberal National	John Hathaway	11,937	54.83	+9.66
Labor	Mandy Johnstone	9,835	45.17	−9.66
Liberal National gain from Labor		Swing	+9.66	

=== Elections in the 2000s ===
2009 Queensland state election: Townsville
Party	Candidate	Votes	%	±%
Labor	Mandy Johnstone	11,109	44.4	−7.7
Liberal National	Murray Hurst	9,844	39.3	+4.0
Greens	Jenny Stirling	2,630	10.5	+3.4
Independent	Delena Oui-Foster	855	3.4	+3.4
Family First	Michael Punshon	597	2.4	+2.4
Total formal votes		25,035	97.4	
Informal votes		625	2.6	
Turnout		25,660	86.8	
Two-party-preferred result
Labor	Mandy Johnstone	12,405	54.0	−5.4
Liberal National	Murray Hurst	10,560	46.0	+5.4
Labor hold		Swing	−5.4	

2006 Queensland state election: Townsville
Party	Candidate	Votes	%	±%
Labor	Mike Reynolds	11,438	51.8	+9.4
Liberal	Jessica Weber	7,858	35.6	+3.3
Greens	John Boucher	1,511	6.8	−6.2
Independent	Steve Todeschini	1,288	5.8	+5.8
Total formal votes		22,095	97.7	−0.0
Informal votes		526	2.3	+0.0
Turnout		22,621	86.5	−1.8
Two-party-preferred result
Labor	Mike Reynolds	12,255	59.1	+3.8
Liberal	Jessica Weber	8,480	40.9	−3.8
Labor hold		Swing	+3.8	

2004 Queensland state election: Townsville
Party	Candidate	Votes	%	±%
Labor	Mike Reynolds	9,478	42.4	−9.6
Liberal	Margaret Shaw	7,224	32.3	−3.2
Greens	Theresa Millard	2,908	13.0	+13.0
One Nation	Ted Ive	1,878	8.4	+8.4
Independent	Delena Foster	593	2.7	+2.7
Independent	Billy Tait	251	1.1	−3.2
Total formal votes		22,332	97.7	+0.9
Informal votes		514	2.3	−0.9
Turnout		22,846	88.3	−1.2
Two-party-preferred result
Labor	Mike Reynolds	10,813	55.3	−4.0
Liberal	Margaret Shaw	8,730	44.7	+4.0
Labor hold		Swing	−4.0	

2001 Queensland state election: Townsville
Party	Candidate	Votes	%	±%
Labor	Mike Reynolds	11,494	52.0	+6.7
Liberal	Fay Barker	7,848	35.5	+7.8
Independent	Wendy Tubman	1,833	8.3	+8.3
Independent	Billy Tait	942	4.3	+2.5
Total formal votes		22,117	96.8	
Informal votes		725	3.2	
Turnout		22,842	89.5	
Two-party-preferred result
Labor	Mike Reynolds	12,319	59.3	+1.8
Liberal	Fay Barker	8,443	40.7	−1.8
Labor hold		Swing	+1.8	

=== Elections in the 1990s ===
1998 Queensland state election: Townsville
Party	Candidate	Votes	%	±%
Labor	Mike Reynolds	8,948	44.6	+0.7
Liberal	Joy Rutledge	5,411	27.0	−15.2
One Nation	Ted Ive	4,948	24.7	+24.7
Independent	Billy Tait	430	2.1	+2.1
Reform	Steve McGuire	308	1.5	+1.5
Total formal votes		20,045	97.7	−0.4
Informal votes		471	2.3	+0.4
Turnout		20,516	90.2	+3.8
Two-party-preferred result
Labor	Mike Reynolds	10,360	57.7	+6.0
Liberal	Joy Rutledge	7,581	42.3	−6.0
Labor hold		Swing	+6.0	

1995 Queensland state election: Townsville
Party	Candidate	Votes	%	±%
Labor	Geoff Smith	8,674	44.0	−7.5
Liberal	Chris Mills	8,326	42.2	+22.2
Greens	Antony Clunies-Ross	2,722	13.8	+13.8
Total formal votes		19,722	98.1	+0.9
Informal votes		378	1.9	−0.9
Turnout		20,100	86.4	
Two-party-preferred result
Labor	Geoff Smith	9,838	51.8	−9.4
Liberal	Chris Mills	9,160	48.2	+9.4
Labor hold		Swing	−9.4	

1992 Queensland state election: Townsville
Party	Candidate	Votes	%	±%
Labor	Geoff Smith	10,839	51.4	−6.2
Liberal	Damien Massingham	4,215	20.0	+4.5
National	Jack Muller	3,271	15.5	−9.5
Independent	Colin Edwards	2,744	13.0	+13.0
Total formal votes		21,069	97.3	
Informal votes		593	2.7	
Turnout		21,662	87.8	
Two-party-preferred result
Labor	Geoff Smith	12,019	61.2	−0.1
Liberal	Damien Massingham	7,631	38.8	+38.8
Labor hold		Swing	−0.1	

=== Elections in the 1980s ===
1989 Queensland state election: Townsville
Party	Candidate	Votes	%	±%
Labor	Ken Davies	9,839	50.2	+11.9
National	Tony Burreket	5,171	26.4	−8.1
Liberal	James Cathcart	3,839	19.6	−4.1
Greens	Sharon Crowe	748	3.8	+3.8
Total formal votes		19,597	96.7	−1.1
Informal votes		663	3.3	+1.1
Turnout		20,260	88.1	−1.6
Two-party-preferred result
Labor	Ken Davies	10,798	55.1	+9.5
National	Tony Burreket	8,799	44.9	−9.5
Labor gain from National		Swing	+9.5	

1986 Queensland state election: Townsville
Party	Candidate	Votes	%	±%
Labor	Tony Mooney	6,693	38.3	−9.1
National	Tony Burreket	6,014	34.5	+5.8
Liberal	Bill Mason	4,140	23.7	+6.0
Democrats	Shireen Malamoo	610	3.5	+3.5
Total formal votes		17,457	97.8	−1.3
Informal votes		384	2.2	+1.3
Turnout		17,841	86.5	−3.1
Two-party-preferred result
National	Tony Burreket	9,502	54.4	+3.9
Labor	Tony Mooney	7,955	45.6	−3.9
National gain from Labor		Swing	+3.9	

1983 Queensland state election: Townsville
Party	Candidate	Votes	%	±%
Labor	Ken McElligott	10,748	47.5	+5.2
National	Peter Arnold	6,508	28.7	+10.2
Liberal	Norman Scott-Young	4,012	17.7	−21.4
Independent	Daniel Gleeson	1,385	6.1	+6.1
Total formal votes		22,653	99.1	+0.6
Informal votes		214	0.9	−0.6
Turnout		22,867	89.6	+5.3
Two-party-preferred result
Labor	Ken McElligott	11,664	51.5	+7.5
National	Peter Arnold	10,989	48.5	+48.5
Labor gain from Liberal		Swing	+7.5	

1980 Queensland state election: Townsville
Party	Candidate	Votes	%	±%
Labor	Brian Dobinson	7,601	42.3	+1.7
Liberal	Norman Scott-Young	7,027	39.1	−11.9
National	Phillip Morton	3,329	18.5	+18.5
Total formal votes		17,957	98.5	−0.2
Informal votes		272	1.5	+0.2
Turnout		18,229	84.3	−1.8
Two-party-preferred result
Liberal	Norman Scott-Young	10,061	56.0	−0.3
Labor	Brian Dobinson	7,896	44.0	+0.3
Liberal hold		Swing	−0.3	

=== Elections in the 1970s ===
1977 Queensland state election: Townsville
Party	Candidate	Votes	%	±%
Liberal	Norman Scott-Young	7,235	51.0	−11.0
Labor	Helen Jeffrey	5,769	40.6	+11.5
Independent	Robert Murray	818	5.8	+5.8
Progress	Kelly Crombie	372	2.6	+2.6
Total formal votes		14,194	98.7	
Informal votes		187	1.3	
Turnout		14,381	86.1	
Two-party-preferred result
Liberal	Norman Scott-Young	7,986	56.3	−10.3
Labor	Helen Jeffrey	6,208	43.7	+10.3
Liberal hold		Swing	−10.3	

1974 Queensland state election: Townsville
Party	Candidate	Votes	%	±%
Liberal	Norman Scott-Young	9,443	62.0	+25.5
Labor	Richard Lindsay	4,427	29.1	−14.2
Queensland Labor	Brian Hurney	690	4.5	−2.8
Australia	Betty Malkin	668	4.4	+4.4
Total formal votes		15,228	98.8	+0.2
Informal votes		185	1.2	−0.2
Turnout		15,413	83.8	−2.0
Two-party-preferred result
Liberal	Norman Scott-Young	10,207	67.0	+5.5
Labor	Richard Lindsay	5,021	33.0	−5.5
Liberal hold		Swing	+5.5	

1972 Queensland state election: Townsville
Party	Candidate	Votes	%	±%
Labor	Mike Reynolds	3,672	43.3	
Liberal	Norman Scott-Young	3,913	36.5	
Country	Owen Griffiths	2,341	21.9	
Queensland Labor	William Higgins	783	7.3	
Total formal votes		10,709	98.6	
Informal votes		148	1.4	
Turnout		10,857	85.8	
Two-party-preferred result
Liberal	Norman Scott-Young	6,588	61.5	+4.3
Labor	Mike Reynolds	4,121	38.5	−4.3
Liberal hold		Swing	+4.3	

=== Elections in the 1960s ===
See Electoral district of Townsville South 1960-1986 and Electoral district of Townsville North 1960-1972 created through redistribution.

Also see Electoral district of Townsville East 1986-1992, Electoral district of Townsville West 1972-1986, Electoral district of Mundingburra 1912-1960, 1992- and Electoral district of Burdekin 1949- created through redistributions.

=== Elections in the 1950s ===
1957 Queensland state election: Townsville
Party	Candidate	Votes	%	±%
Labor	George Keyatta	2,631	40.1	−6.8
Liberal	Roy Pope	2,290	34.9	−1.3
Queensland Labor	Lionel Tomlins	1,637	25.0	+25.0
Total formal votes		6,558	98.4	−0.7
Informal votes		105	1.6	+0.7
Turnout		6,663	92.2	+1.1
Labor hold		Swing	−2.9	

1956 Queensland state election: Townsville
Party	Candidate	Votes	%	±%
Labor	George Keyatta	2,982	46.9	−11.5
Liberal	Roy Pope	2,301	36.2	+9.8
Independent	Jack Abercrombie	915	14.4	+2.3
Communist	Hugh Fay	156	2.5	−0.6
Total formal votes		4,354	99.1	+0.4
Informal votes		58	0.9	−0.4
Turnout		4,412	91.1	−1.3
Labor hold		Swing	−10.6	

1953 Queensland state election: Townsville
Party	Candidate	Votes	%	±%
Labor	George Keyatta	3,786	58.4	+6.8
Liberal	Archibald Hooper	1,713	26.4	−12.0
NQ Labor	Kevin Gormley	782	12.1	+4.9
Communist	Hugh Fay	200	3.1	+3.1
Total formal votes		6,481	98.7	+0.1
Informal votes		85	1.3	−0.1
Turnout		6,566	92.4	+5.8
Labor hold		Swing	+11.5	

1950 Queensland state election: Townsville
Party	Candidate	Votes	%	±%
Labor	George Keyatta	3,699	51.6	
Liberal	John Taaffe	2,753	38.4	
NQ Labor	Pat Rooney	517	7.2	
Independent	Robert Baker	198	2.8	
Total formal votes		7,167	98.6	
Informal votes		99	1.4	
Turnout		7,266	86.6	
Labor hold		Swing		

=== Elections in the 1940s ===
1947 Queensland state election: Townsville
Party	Candidate	Votes	%	±%
Labor	George Keyatta	6,306	67.8	+4.9
Country	Fred Feather	2,997	32.2	+32.2
Total formal votes		9,303	98.6	+0.1
Informal votes		128	1.4	−0.1
Turnout		9,431	84.4	+2.6
Labor hold		Swing	N/A	

1944 Queensland state election: Townsville
Party	Candidate	Votes	%	±%
Labor	George Keyatta	5,583	62.9	−37.1
Hermit Park Labor	Ernest O'Brien	1,863	21.0	+21.0
People's Party	Athena Deane	1,425	16.1	+16.1
Total formal votes		8,871	98.5	
Informal votes		132	1.5	
Turnout		9,003	81.8	
Labor hold		Swing	N/A	

1941 Queensland state election: Townsville
Party	Candidate	Votes	%	±%
Labor	George Keyatta	unopposed		
Labor hold		Swing		

=== Elections in the 1930s ===
1938 Queensland state election: Townsville
Party	Candidate	Votes	%	±%
Labor	Maurice Hynes	4,379	50.0	−27.0
Protestant Labour	Alfred Loveridge	2,378	27.2	+27.2
Country	Spenser Hopkins	1,445	16.5	−6.5
Communist	Albert Robinson	548	6.3	+6.3
Total formal votes		8,750	99.2	+0.9
Informal votes		66	0.8	−0.9
Turnout		8,816	89.5	+1.5
Labor hold		Swing	N/A	

- Preferences were not distributed.

1935 Queensland state election: Townsville
Party	Candidate	Votes	%	±%
Labor	Maurice Hynes	6,459	77.0	
CPNP	Percy Davids	1,935	23.0	
Total formal votes		8,394	98.3	
Informal votes		146	1.7	
Turnout		8,540	88.0	
Labor hold		Swing		

1932 Queensland state election: Townsville
Party	Candidate	Votes	%	±%
Labor	Maurice Hynes	5,686	73.0	
Independent	John Burns	1,990	25.5	
Communist	Douglas Price	114	1.5	
Total formal votes		7,790	98.8	
Informal votes		92	1.2	
Turnout		7,882	92.0	
Labor hold		Swing		

- Preferences were not distributed.

=== Elections in the 1920s ===
1929 Queensland state election: Townsville
Party	Candidate	Votes	%	±%
Labor	Maurice Hynes	2,437	54.5	−9.7
CPNP	Ernest Garbutt	1,890	42.3	+6.5
Communist	Desmond Morris	116	2.6	+2.6
Independent	William Jackson	25	0.6	+0.6
Total formal votes		4,468	96.9	−1.6
Informal votes		144	3.1	+1.6
Turnout		4,612	88.4	+1.5
Labor hold		Swing	N/A	

1926 Queensland state election: Townsville
Party	Candidate	Votes	%	±%
Labor	Maurice Hynes	2,903	64.2	+12.2
CPNP	John Shearer	1,617	35.8	−12.2
Total formal votes		4,520	98.5	−0.6
Informal votes		67	1.5	+0.6
Turnout		4,587	86.9	+4.5
Labor hold		Swing	+12.2	

1923 Queensland state election: Townsville
Party	Candidate	Votes	%	±%
Labor	Maurice Hynes	2,168	52.0	+7.0
United	William Green	2,004	48.0	−7.0
Total formal votes		4,172	99.1	+0.7
Informal votes		38	0.9	−0.7
Turnout		4,210	82.4	+2.4
Labor gain from United		Swing	+7.0	

1920 Queensland state election: Townsville
Party	Candidate	Votes	%	±%
Northern Country	William Green	2,901	55.0	+55.0
Labor	Daniel Ryan	2,376	45.0	−9.1
Total formal votes		5,277	98.4	+0.2
Informal votes		88	1.6	−0.2
Turnout		5,365	80.0	+2.9
Independent Country gain from Labor		Swing	N/A	

=== Elections in the 1910s ===
1918 Queensland state election: Townsville
Party	Candidate	Votes	%	±%
Labor	Daniel Ryan	2,877	54.6	+2.4
National	Hedley Gelston	2,388	45.4	−2.4
Total formal votes		5,265	98.2	−0.4
Informal votes		94	1.8	+0.4
Turnout		5,359	77.1	−2.4
Labor hold		Swing	+2.4	

1915 Queensland state election: Townsville
Party	Candidate	Votes	%	±%
Labor	Daniel Ryan	2,318	52.2	+6.5
Liberal	Robert Philp	2,120	47.8	−6.5
Total formal votes		4,438	98.6	+0.3
Informal votes		62	1.4	−0.3
Turnout		4,500	79.5	+6.8
Labor gain from Liberal		Swing	+6.5	

1912 Queensland state election: Townsville
Party	Candidate	Votes	%	±%
Liberal	Robert Philp	1,908	54.3	
Labor	Alexander Austin	1,604	45.7	
Total formal votes		3,512	98.3	
Informal votes		60	1.7	
Turnout		3,572	72.7	
Liberal hold		Swing		
