= William Aplin =

Australian politician

The Hon William Aplin
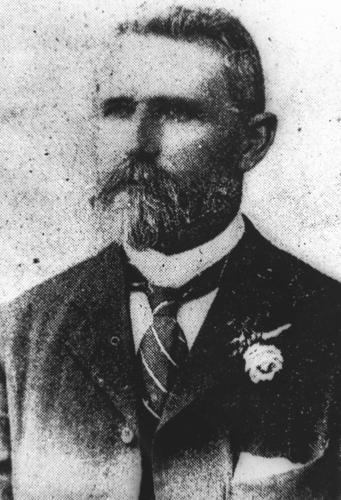

Member of the Queensland Legislative Council
- In office 19 October 1880 – 18 February 1901

Personal details
- Born: William Aplin; 27 April 1840 Combe St Nicholas, Somerset, England
- Died: 18 February 1901 (aged 60) Warwick, Queensland, Australia
- Resting place: Toowong Cemetery
- Spouse(s): Mary Jane Bristol (m.1865 d.1895), Isabella Annie Campbell (m.1897 d.1927)
- Occupation: Company director

William Aplin (27 April 1840 – 18 February 1901) was an Australian pioneer, businessman and politician of Queensland in the 19th century.

== Early life ==
William Aplin was born on 'Sticklepath' farm near Combe St Nicholas, Somerset, England and baptised in St Nicholas Anglican church there in 1840.

He was raised a middle child in a family of six, to a rural life in a well to do yeoman farming family in Dorset and Wiltshire. He was trained from an early age in the way of Yeoman martial arts, including riding and shooting. He received an education and finished at the Bourton Academy in East Tisbury, Wiltshire. He was raised in the Anglican Christian faith.

William Aplin was recorded living and working as an agricultural labourer at Awliscombe, Devon, in the England census of 1861. He emigrated at 22 years of age, for a better life in the new British Colony of Queensland. He travelled well, as a cabin class passenger on the sailing ship Wanata, out of London on 2 November 1862, and which stopped to load more passengers at Cork, Ireland on 12 Nov, and landed at Brisbane, Queensland on 20 Feb 1863. He obtained a position as a sales representative for merchants Seaward, Marsh & Company, at Port Denison, Bowen, Queensland in 1863, on the wild northern frontier of settlement.

== Business ==
William Aplin saw opportunity in a development further north and formed a partnership Clifton & Aplin with William Clifton, the shipping agent for the Australasian Steam Navigation Company shipping agent at Port Denison, to establish a mercantile supply and commission agency business in the new settlement of Townsville on Cleveland Bay and the Ross River, Queensland. The new business was run in association with his old boss, William Marsh (1837–1909 & Lord Mayor of Mackay in 1878). They bought one of the first land lots for £200, on the north bank of the Ross River in 1864. They built a store there on the future corner of Flinders and Denham Street, Townsville, and petitioned the Queensland Government to gazette the new town of Townsville in 1865. Aplin was appointed by the Government as the first postmaster there in 1866. The north Queensland rivers were full of dangers including crocodiles and it was recorded that 'some black kiddies were bathing from a Ross River wharf when one on them was 'snapped'' and a 12-foot (3.7 m) crocodile was shot from a wharf there in 1880. William Aplin was joined by his brother Henry Aplin from England, who invested an inheritance to establish the business of Clifton & Aplin Brothers in June 1865. Unfortunately their store was destroyed by a cyclone on 3 Mar 1867, along with a third of the town, but their confidence remained unshaken and they rebuilt it. Townsville soon boomed by providing services to the new Charters Towers and Ravenswood goldrushes, located nearby in the 1860s. William Aplin established the first metallurgical business in North Queensland, the Gold Quartz Crushing Company in Townsville in 1869, that crushed ore from the goldfields.

William Aplin was joined by another brother, John Aplin, from England in 1870. The Aplin brothers conducted the hands-on agency dealings and sales of goods, whilst Clifton who was more courtly, managed the financial business. Clifton & Aplin Brothers developed into the largest mercantile, shipping, stock and station and financial business in northern Australia, servicing the pastoral and mining industries and had the largest warehouse in Townsville. Branch offices were opened in Normanton in 1871, Cairns in 1876, Burketown in 1879, Brisbane, Cooktown, Rockhampton and Thursday Island in the Torres Strait. The business was recorded generously giving 12 months credit to a regular teamster customer, for 16 tons of goods in 1878. The Aplin brothers were known as hard-riding bushmen who loved the wide open spaces, according to the Townsville Heritage Trail. William Aplin and Henry Aplin joined the Hodgkinson gold rush by purchasing a land lot at Thornborough near Dimbulah, Queensland in 1879. This was the scene of European and Chinese rioting over mining claims in 1880 that resulted in over 60 deaths and the Chinese fleeing from the goldfield. In 1879 they were joined in business by the Bank of New South Wales manager in Townsville, William Villiers Brown (1843–1915 & Lord Mayor of Townsville 1883 & a Queensland Parliamentarian 1885–93).

Around that time William Clifton was considering retirement and William Aplin was considering a director's role, as his focus moved towards Pastoralism and politics. The business was restructured as Aplin, Brown & Company in 1880. The Company began to specialise in mining and industrial machinery and acquired a wharf at the port in Brisbane for imports from America in 1881. William Aplin took on a new interest in maritime shipping, as the Company owned and operated ships that worked the trade routes across northern Australia. The ships included the 120-ton Brigantine Hannah Broomfield that sailed the Albert River into Burketown, Ketch named Lalla Rookh, iron steamship Herbert (built for the Company in England in 1884), steel steamship Queensland (built for the Company in Maryborough, Queensland in 1884) and Delta (first vessel built in Townsville in 1884). The business prospered during the economic boom of the 1880s, that peaked with the silver and land speculation bubble in 1887–88. Aplin, Brown & Co used their profits to renew their office and warehouse on the Ross River, by constructing the fine Neo-Classical Aplin Brown & Company Building at 232 Flinders Street. The building consisted of 3 storeys, containing a head office, shipping department and sales department in 1887 and is now heritage-listed. William Aplin was joined in business by his eldest son, Wil Aplin, who was appointed manager of the Company office in Burketown in the 1880s. Also a new Company office was opened in Darwin, Northern Territory, by Edward Wareham in 1887, and he was promoted to shipping manager at Townsville in 1888, as William Aplin focussed on politics. The Company's buildings and stock in Darwin were totally destroyed in a terrible cyclone that devastated the town, sunk the pearling fleet in the harbour on 7 January 1897 and caused 28 deaths. William Aplin was recorded in Pugh's Almanac & Queensland Directory as a member of the Company in 1893.

In 1881 at 41 years of age William Aplin returned to his rural roots and purchased the huge Southwick Pastoral station of 270,000 acres (110,000 ha). It was advertised as:

"Southwick and Reedy Lake Stations, 100 miles west of Townsville in the North Kennedy District containing 422 sq miles of splendid basaltic country permanently watered by frontage of 35 miles to Fletchers Creek, 35 miles to Allingham Creek and 15 miles to Burdekin River, together with 7,000 breeding cattle, amongst them a stud herd of 300. There is a good home station with a paddock of 2,000 acres besides 2 out-stations with sets of yards, 50 horses and station plant given in."

The property was described by a station manager in the late 1860s as:

a rough life, with fever, blight and the constant danger from blacks who infested the 'Basalt Wall', a peculiar formation running for miles parallel with two running creeks, the Fletcher and Sandy, both of which abounded in fish. The Wall was a veritable stronghold for the blacks, who realising the security it was, were very bold and daring. During my stay on 'Reedy Lake' station, I had one of my shepherds killed and lost a number of sheep, many of which were driven away in mobs of 50 at a time. I can safely say that life was never safe and the wise thing to do on seeing a black, was to shoot and shoot straight, otherwise he would certainly spear you. I had several narrow escapes."

William Aplin managed a large Aboriginal camp on Southwick and employed many of them as stockmen and some of the women as housemaids. After his death, under the Protection of Aboriginals Act 1897 the Government established Southwick Reserve, comprising 7,700 acres (3,100 ha) there in 1901. Aplin raised fine herds of Shorthorn Cattle, up to 15,000 head and improved the breed by using his stud Shorthorn Bulls. The cattle would roam wild over unfenced Southwick land and across adjacent properties. They were mustered in their hundreds on boundary camps where the cattle were drafted (known colloquially as cut out) between the different stations. This was difficult work involving around 12 stockmen, including his adult sons Harry Aplin and Arthur Aplin. Five stockmen were assigned to keep the herd on camp, one to mind the drafted cattle and six to ride here, there and everywhere in the herd and chasing wild bullocks by galloping at top speed with stockwhips volleying vicious reports. After the first 20 cattle were drafted off and steadied, the work proceeded more rapidly but sometimes a rogue (known colloquially as a gunner) bullock would charge and bore in on the stock horse, sending horse and rider crashing to the ground. William Aplin diversified into horse breeding and raised fine herds of up to 500 head of stock horses. They were mostly the progeny of the thoroughbred sire Exeter (by dam Panic), and the remainder by the grey sire Kelpie. The British Indian Army horse buyer and Townsville warrior, Robert Gordon (1866–1944), used to buy 12 horses each year from Southwick. Also Harry Aplin accompanied some good horses on Company ships to Madras (now Chennai), India, where he sold them direct to the British Army. However the pastoral business did not run to plan and Aplin lost a fortune during the economic depression of the 1890s, that bottomed with the Bank failures in 1893, compounded by a long drought from 1895, that became known as the Federation Drought of 1895–1903. In addition cattle herds became infected with redwater fever transmitted by ticks and died in large numbers in the district in 1895 and 'Southwick' lost half of its huge herd. As misfortune often comes in threes, his creditor Banks then tried to close the station and sell off the assets. William Aplin was described by a bushman as a cheery man who in his heart was always a bushman, with the love of wide open spaces, the brave horses, the flocks spreading over the open downs, or the dash to deal with rowdy cattle, or cut off a mob in a moonlighting expedition. He was a friend of explorer and Pastoralist William Hann of Maryvale pastoral station near Charters Towers and travelled with him to attend the Colonial and Indian Exhibition in London in 1886. Around that time Aplin's interests increasingly turned to business in Townsville and politics in Brisbane and he was seldom at home on the range.

== Politics ==
William Aplin was a personable, friendly man of intelligence who was blessed with enormous energy. He took a keen interest in the community from an early age, in addition to his business affairs. He was elected to the first Townsville Municipal Council in 1866 and at 29 years of age, became Lord Mayor of Townsville in 1869. He worked on committees for schools, hospitals and cemeteries and was appointed by the Government as Justice of the Peace in Townsville. He was a member of the board of trustees for the Townsville Grammar School in 1888.

He was well regarded on the Etheridge Gold field, where in 1875 the miners at the Royal Hotel in Georgetown petitioned him to stand for election as Member of the Queensland Legislative Assembly for the Burke District, but he declined saying that his business engagements required the whole of his attention. Maintaining an interest in Pastoralism, he was elected to the Thuringowa Divisional Board at Townsville in 1879 and at 41 years became its Chairman in 1882. After moving to Southwick he was elected to the Dalrymple Divisional Board at Charters Towers in 1883 and served on it for 17 years up to his death. He was a member and became President of the North Queensland Pastoral and Agricultural Association. William Aplin was appointed at 40 years of age to the Queensland Legislative Council at Brisbane on 19 Oct 1880 and served a parliamentarian for the rest of his life. He was renowned for giving much useful help in debates affecting the more distant parts of the Colony.

== Family life ==
William Aplin probably met Mary Jane Bristol when a student at her uncle James Bristol's Bourton Academy in East Tisbury. A romance blossomed when she moved to live in East Knoyle, Wiltshire and they were betrothed there just before he emigrated in 1862. They maintained their relationship across the world, whilst he established himself in business and after two years he sent for her to come to Queensland. Aged 25 years, William Aplin married Mary Bristol at the Congregational church in Bowen. They raised a large family of eight children in wealthy circumstances to both city and rural life in north Queensland. He built a home called Edgecliff Townhouse in Cleveland Terrace, Melton Hill, Townsville but it was soon destroyed in the cyclone of 1867 and he rebuilt it. He built a mansion, Knoyle Park in Mundingburra, Townsville in 1878 as the family home and employed servants there. He had an avenue of mango trees planted along the driveway (now Mango Ave). He then moved the family into the wilderness at Southwick around 1882 and they made the homestead there comfortable. It became renowned as a centre of hospitality in the Charters Towers district. However whilst away for periods on business or at Parliament in Brisbane, he conducted an affair with the young daughter of businessman and parliamentarian James Campbell. The affair brought him into bitter conflict with his wife and children. After being widowed at 55 years, he married his mistress, Isabella Annie Campbell (1862–1927) at her family's Camona mansion in Kelvin Grove, Brisbane in 1897. They honeymooned at Governor Lord Lamington's Harlaxton House in Toowoomba. However she fought with his children in Townsville and then the couple lived at Invermay mansion on Herston Road in Brisbane.

William Aplin was sports minded and a racing identity who was a member of the Townsville Turf Club and became its president in 1893. As a former British Yeoman he competed in shooting contests including the Intercolonial Parliamentary Rifle Matches. He was a crack shot and was recorded at 57 years competing in the Queensland Rifle Association medal over 500 yards (460 m) at Brisbane, where he came second after a 3-way shoot-off.

William Aplin was a prominent and respected personality who was esteemed for his unswerving honesty and amiability. Family tradition states that he was fond of the trappings of wealth and power and liked to impress by living a high life at his town mansion, Knoyle Park and travelled about Townsville in a horse drawn coach emblazed with the Aplin Family Crest.

== Death and legacy ==
William Aplin suffered from chronic Brights Disease (a disease of the kidneys). After suffering with illness for a year and convalescing in the highlands at Stanthorpe, he died at 60 years at Warwick, Queensland in 1901. His funeral was a big social occasion attended by Brisbane high society including: brother-in-law & Premier of Queensland and founder of Burns Philp & Co, Sir Robert Philp; father-in-law & businessman, James Campbell; brother-in law & businessman & politician, John Dunmore Campbell; brother in law & businessman, Charles William Campbell; brother-in-law & businessman & politician, James Forsyth; grazier & past Premier of Queensland, Sir Hugh Nelson; politician & past Wesleyan Prime Minister, Fred Brentnall; grazier & politician, William Allan; grazier & politician, Albert Norton; businessman & politician, John Archibald; Minister for Public Works & businessman, John Leahy; businessman & past Minister for Lands, Sir Alfred Cowley; grazier and politician, John Cameron (see Aus Dict Biog); past Police Commissioner David Seymour (see Aus Dict Biog); Railways Commissioner Robert Gray; Manager of Adelaide Steamship Company & his former employee, Edward Wareham; and other financial, mercantile and pastoral businessmen, and by one blood member of his family, Wil Aplin. He was buried in Toowong Cemetery, Brisbane, and was survived by seven of his children. However he had lived beyond his means and died with a huge debt of £40,000 (560 x annual average wages). His will and estate was disputed with legal action dragging on for many years, whilst the severe Federation Drought intensified, leading to the disastrous loss of 7,000 head of cattle on Southwick in 1902.

William Aplin is commemorated by a memorial in Flinders Street, Townsville. Various places were named after him, including Aplin Street in Townsville, Aplin's Waterhole and Aplin's Weir on the Ross River off Wentworth Street in Mundingburra, Aplin Street in Cairns, Mount Aplin in Cape York Peninsula, Aplin District in Thursday Island and Aplin Passage in Torres Strait, as well as the Aplin Parish near Hughenden.
