= Clifton and Aplin =

Australian mercantile business

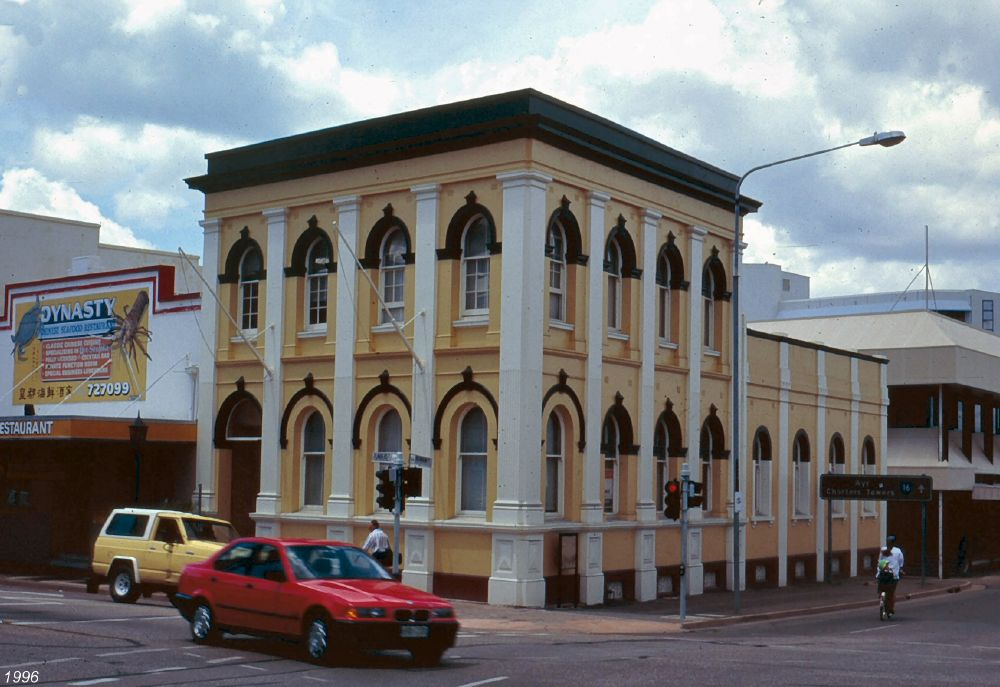
Former Aplin Brown & Company Building, Townsville, 1996

Clifton and Aplin was a mercantile business in North Queensland, Australia. It was one of the pioneering businesses in Townsville and the Gulf of Carpentaria. It later became Aplin Brown & Company, and later Aplin Brown & Crawshay.

== History ==
William Aplin commenced business with William Clifton as merchants in Townsville in 1864, at that time catering for the pastoral industry. Clifton had previously been the Bowen representative for the Australasian Steam Navigation Company. William Aplin had been the Bowen representative for the merchant business, Seaward, Marsh & Co. They purchased a block of land at the corner of Flinders and Denham Streets, conveniently close to the Ross Creek wharves, but their building was destroyed in a cyclone in 1866. They rebuilt and William's brother Henry Aplin joined the firm.

Clifton and Aplin established a store in Normanton around 1871 and one in Burketown in 1879. In May 1880, their Gulf stores were taken over by James Burns (of Burns Philp) as part of his campaign to monopolise trade in the Gulf.

In 1879 William Villiers Brown, formerly manager of the Bank of New South Wales in Townsville, became a partner, and in 1880 when Clifton left Townsville, the firm became Aplin Brown & Company. By 1880 Aplin Brown one of the leading merchants firms in Townsville, servicing both the pastoral industry and the extensive gold mining centres of the inland. Amongst other activities, they imported mining and industrial machinery.

In 1881, The Queenslander noted that "the Hon. W. Aplin is about to embark upon pastoral pursuits, having retired from the firm of which he was the popular chief." The firm then became a limited company and continued to expand. The first steel ship built in Townsville was built for them in 1884 and in 1885 the firm acquired a wharf in Brisbane and set up a branch which specialised in importing goods from the USA. They established branches at Burketown and Port Darwin and in 1887 Aplin and Brown commissioned Rooney Brothers to design a new head office for the company, now the heritage-listed Aplin Brown & Company Building.

About 1895, the business became Aplin Brown & Crawshay.
