= Patrick Hanran =

Australian politician

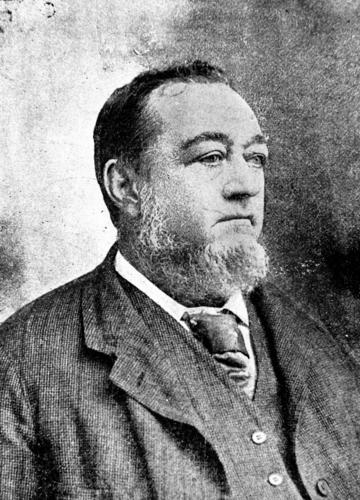

Member of the Queensland Legislative Assembly for Townsville
- In office 11 March 1899 – 2 October 1909 Serving with Robert Philp
- Preceded by: William Castling
- Succeeded by: Thomas Foley

Personal details
- Born: Patrick Francis Hanran; 16 September 1831 Limerick, Ireland
- Died: 8 August 1916 (aged 84) Townsville, Queensland, Australia
- Resting place: West End Cemetery
- Party: Ministerialist
- Spouse: Mary Anne Ogle (m.1864 d.1912)
- Occupation: Gold miner

Patrick Francis Hanran (16 September 1831 – 8 August 1916) was a member of the Queensland Legislative Assembly.

== Early life ==
Hanran was born in Limerick, Ireland, the son of Corporal Francis Hanrahan and his wife Bridget (née Hayes). His family came to Australia in 1834 when his father was appointed commandant of the Bowens Hollow Convict settlement and was educated at the Christian Brothers School in Sydney. On leaving school he worked at the family commission agency in Sydney before going gold mining in Victoria, New South Wales, and New Zealand. He was at Eureka during the Eureka Stockade in 1854 where, with the aid of a Catholic priest, jumped over the barricade after the fighting had ceased to pass back bodies of the dead and dying protesters. In 1866 he was a storekeeper in Townsville but was declared insolvent in 1875.

== Public career ==
Hanran was an alderman on the Townsville City Council for 27 years, from around 1868 until 1895. He was mayor of Townsville on seven occasions - 1871–1872, 1876–1877, 1879, 1882, 1892, 1893 and 1896. At the 1899 Queensland colonial election he joined his Ministerial colleague, Robert Philp as the member for Townsville, defeating the Labour pairing of Anthony Ogden and Thomas Foley and the at the time Independent politician, William Lennon. He went on to hold the seat until 1909 when he retired from politics.

== Personal life ==
On 17 September 1864 he married Mary Anne Ogle in Townsville and together had two sons and five daughters. Hanran died in August 1916 and his funeral proceeded from his former residence at Melton Hill to the West End Cemetery.

Parliament of Queensland
Preceded by William Castling	Member for Townsville; 1899–1909; Served alongside: Robert Philp	Succeeded by Thomas Foley
