= Castling (surname) =

Castling is a surname. Notable people with the surname include:

- Harry Castling (1865–1933), English lyricist
- William Castling (1838–1906), English-born Queensland politician

== See also ==
- Castling, a chess move
