= Aplin Brown & Company Building =

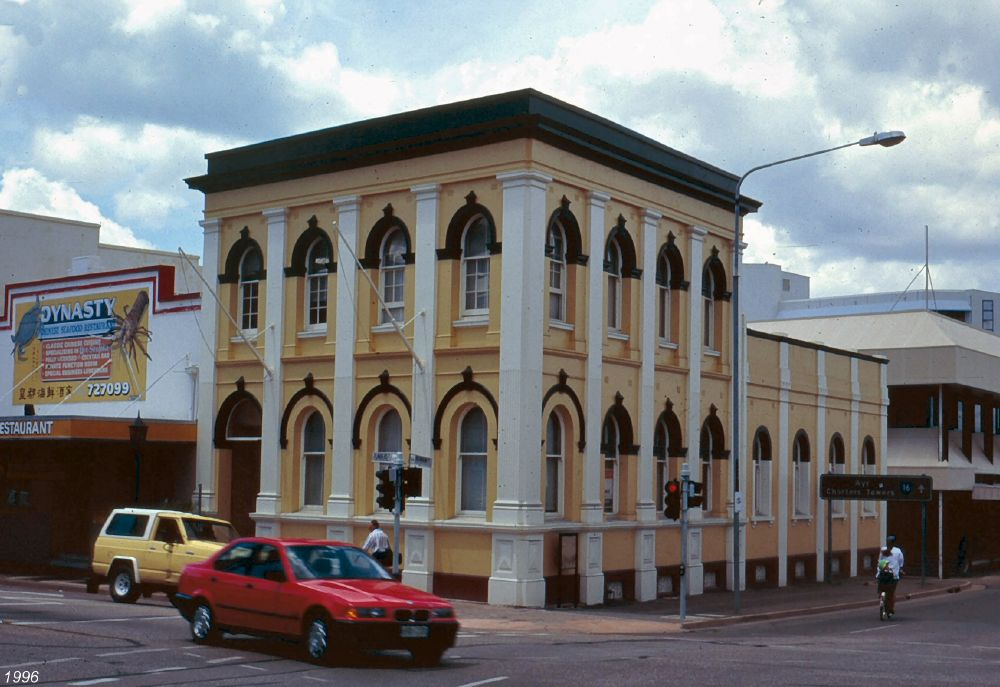
- Aplin Brown & Company Building, 1996

- Location within Queensland Location within Australia
- 19.2582°S 146.8186°E
- Location: 232–234 Flinders Street, Townsville CBD, City of Townsville, Queensland, Australia

History
- Design period: 1870s–1890s (late 19th century)
- Built: 1887

Site notes
- Architectural style: Classicism

Queensland Heritage Register
- Official name: Aplin Brown & Company Building (former), Buckaroo's Restaurant, Family Services, Toula's Taverna
- Type: state heritage (built)
- Designated: 21 October 1992
- Reference no.: 600919
- Significant period: 1880s, 1930s (fabric); 1887–c. 1974 (historical – commercial use); 1891–1894 (bank use); 1974–1995 (government use)
- Builders: Rooney Brothers

Aplin Brown & Company Building is a heritage-listed commercial building at 232–234 Flinders Street, Townsville CBD, City of Townsville, Queensland, Australia. It was built in 1887 by Rooney Brothers. It is also known as Buckaroo's Restaurant, Family Services, and Toula's Taverna. It was added to the Queensland Heritage Register on 21 October 1992.

== History ==
This building was constructed in 1887 by Rooney Brothers as offices for the trading endeavours of Aplin Brown & Company, one of the leading mercantile companies in North Queensland.

Townsville was established in 1864 by partners John Melton Black and Robert Towns and Port of Townsville was gazetted as a port of entry in 1865. It grew quickly as a supply centre and by 1873 the port was receiving international as well as coastal traffic. Improvements were carried out to port facilities to allow larger ships to anchor. By 1880 Townsville was the port for several major goldfields and had opened the first stage of the Great Northern railway line westwards through Charters Towers and beyond, consolidating its importance as a port and mercantile centre. Townsville had many prosperous mercantile and shipping firms including that of Aplin Brown and Co. Both Aplin and Brown were mayors of Townsville, Aplin in 1869 and Brown in 1883, demonstrating the importance of commerce in the growth of the city.

William Aplin commenced business with William Clifton as merchants in Townsville in 1864, at that time catering for the pastoral industry. They purchased a block of land at the corner of Flinders and Denham Streets, conveniently close to the Ross Creek wharves, but their building was destroyed in a cyclone in 1866. They rebuilt and Henry Aplin joined the firm. In 1879 William Villiers Brown, formerly manager of the Bank of New South Wales in Townsville, became a partner, and in 1880 when Mr Clifton left Townsville, the firm became Aplin Brown & Company. By 1880 Aplin Brown one of the leading merchants firms in Townsville, servicing both the pastoral industry and the extensive gold mining centres of the inland. Amongst other activities, they imported mining and industrial machinery.

In 1881, The Queenslander noted that "the Hon. W. Aplin is about to embark upon pastoral pursuits, having retired from the firm of which he was the popular chief." The firm then became a limited company and continued to expand. The first steel ship built in Townsville was built for them in 1884 and in 1885 the firm acquired a wharf in Brisbane and set up a branch which specialised in importing goods from the USA. They established branches at Burketown and Port Darwin and in 1887 Aplin and Brown commissioned Rooney Brothers to design a new head office for the company, taking out a mortgage on the land for £6000.

Rooney Brothers was a partnership of Irish brothers John and Matthew Rooney. John Rooney had initially been in partnership with another brother, Jacob, in Maryborough where they worked as builders and contractors from 1868. In 1875 John became the Townsville partner in the firm and in 1882 formed a new partnership with Matthew as architects, builders and contractors. They formed a second company, Rooney & Co. in partnership with James Harvey and this firm were timber merchants, sawmillers and joiners. Amongst other business, they supplied mining settlements with timber, prefabricated buildings and such items as ironmongery and furniture.

The new building reflected the prosperity and prestige of the company, being a handsome masonry structure of neo-classical design. It was also designed to amply fulfil the business needs of the company. The ground floor had rooms branching from a central hall that housed insurance, shipping and sales departments, a private office, bookkeepers and cashiers offices and a strong room. The upper level contained a large correspondence room and office, but did not extend over the sales and shipping department which occupied the rear of the ground floor.

In 1891 the building was leased to the Commercial Banking Company of Sydney for three years, but the connection with Aplin Brown did not cease and in 1899 a new title for the property was issued under the name of Aplin Brown and Crawshay Limited. In 1913 the building was purchased by another important northern trading company, Bartlam's Limited. They were general merchants who supplied stations in western Queensland and who, by the mid 1920s had also taken over the premises of Wright Heaton in Charters Towers, thus having offices at both port and western centre.

The ground floor of the building on the northern elevation to Flinders Street was originally built as an arcaded loggia with the window line recessed one bay. This was enclosed, probably during the 1930s, and the former front wall removed. This may also have been when the balustraded parapet was removed. In 1944 the property was transferred to Alfred and Arthur Howard Emery, but by 1950 was owned by the Mutual Life & Citizens Assurance Company Limited.

The former Aplin & Company building was acquired in 1974 by the Queensland Government and the land designated Reserve 740. The building was used by the Department of Family Services and during this occupancy the interior was modified to meet office requirements. The Government sold the building in 1995 to another owner who converted the ground floor for use as a dress shop. Since 1997 this floor has functioned as a restaurant.

== Description ==
The former Aplin Brown and Company building is a masonry building situated on a wedge shaped block of land at the corner of Flinders and Denham Streets, opposite the post office and Perc Tucker Art Gallery, formerly the Union Bank.

The main part of the building at the corner is two storeys in height and the section to the rear along Denham Street is single storey. The corrugated iron roof is concealed by a severely plain parapet.

The elevations to Flinders and Denham Streets are rendered and divided into bays by pilasters, with horizontal architraves and a projecting cornice above. Between are single-pane vertical sash windows with rounded heads and render mouldings. Formerly an arcade, the archways of the lower level of the northern elevation have been infilled with windows similar to those of the remainder of the building, although the mouldings to these former archways are a higher level than those of the adjoining windows.

The entry is presently at the eastern end of the Flinders Street elevation, rising up several steps to the glazed entry. Once inside, a timber staircase gives access to the upper level. A lantern was built above the staircase.

There is a rear entry to the building from the laneway to the south. The interior of the building has been altered substantially for office accommodation with the installation of air-conditioning, false ceilings, partitions and toilets to the rear of the single-storey wing and the upper level.

== Heritage listing ==
The former Aplin Brown & Company Building was listed on the Queensland Heritage Register on 21 October 1992 having satisfied the following criteria.

The place is important in demonstrating the evolution or pattern of Queensland's history.

The design and quality of the former Aplin Brown & Company building demonstrates the prosperity of Townsville in the 1880s and the way in which North Queensland was developed by the establishment of key ports as commercial and administrative centres. Located on a major intersection of Townsville's central business district and conveniently close to the wharves, the Aplin and Company building is a reminder of the importance of trade to this development.

The place is important in demonstrating the principal characteristics of a particular class of cultural places.

The former Aplin Brown & Company building is important as a good example of a substantial nineteenth century office building in North Queensland.

The place is important because of its aesthetic significance.

The former Aplin Brown & Company building is located on the major intersection of Denham and Flinders Streets, where, by its design, form and materials, it makes a substantial visual contribution to the built character of the city.

The place has a special association with the life or work of a particular person, group or organisation of importance in Queensland's history.

The building was constructed for Aplin Brown & Company, a mercantile and shipping firm who made a major contribution to the prosperity of Townsville in the 19th century. It is also connected with Bartlam's Limited, another important North Queensland merchant and with the firm of Rooney Bros. who were influential in North Queensland as architects, builders and contractors.
