= Thomas Foley (Australian politician) =

Australian politician

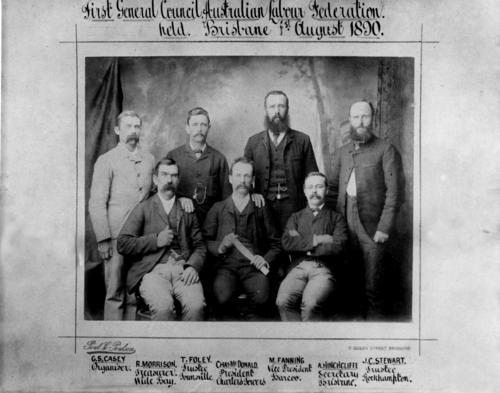
- Group portrait of members of the Australian Labor Party, 1890 - Foley is third from the left

Member of the Queensland Legislative Assembly for Townsville
- In office 2 October 1909 – 27 April 1912
- Preceded by: Patrick Hanran
- Succeeded by: Robert Philp

Member of the Queensland Legislative Assembly for Mundingburra
- In office 27 April 1912 – 16 September 1920
- Preceded by: New seat
- Succeeded by: John Dash

Personal details
- Born: Thomas Foley; 14 June 1853 Swansea, Wales
- Died: 16 September 1920 (aged 67) Townsville, Queensland, Australia
- Resting place: West End Cemetery
- Party: Labor Party
- Spouse: Mary Harris (m.1873 d.1931)
- Occupation: Stevedore

Thomas Foley (14 June 1853 - 16 September 1920) was a member of the Queensland Legislative Assembly.

== Biography ==
Foley was born in Swansea, Wales, the son of John Foley and his wife Elizabeth (née Edwards) and was educated at the British Admiralty School. He came to Townsville with his wife and four children in 1883 at a time when vacant houses in the area were scarce and the family had to make do with living in a tent in an area of Townsville known as Canvastown. They eventually moved to a house in Macrossan Street where he lived for the rest of his life. He secured work at first with the Townsville City Council and later worked on some of the early brick buildings of the town including the municipal buildings and St James' Cathedral. He later worked on the wharves of Townsville as a stevedore.

Foley married he married Mary Harris (died 1931) in Swansea in 1873 and together had seven sons and four daughters. After being seriously ill with heart troubles and asthma for several months he died in Townsville in September 1920 and his funeral moved from his late residence to the West End Cemetery.

== Public career ==
An early member of the Waterside Workers Union, Foley was elected as an alderman on the Townsville City Council for the South Ward on two separate occasions. He then stood at the 1907 Queensland state election as a representative of the Labour Party for the two-member seat of Townsville but was defeated by the Opposition pairing of Robert Philp and Patrick Hanran. He stood again at the 1908 Queensland state election and after leading on the primary vote eventually lost again to the same pair after the postal votes had been counted.

He stood again at the 1909 Queensland state election and this time was successful, winning the vote and becoming the senior member for the seat. He represented the electorate until it reverted to a one-member seat at the 1912 Queensland state election at which time he switched to the new neighbouring seat of Mundingburra. He went on to represent the people of that electorate until his death in 1920.

Parliament of Queensland
Preceded by Patrick Hanran	Member for Townsville; 1909–1912; Served alongside: Robert Philp	Succeeded by Robert Philp
New seat	Member for Mundingburra; 1912–1920	Succeeded by John Dash
