= John Macrossan =

Australian politician

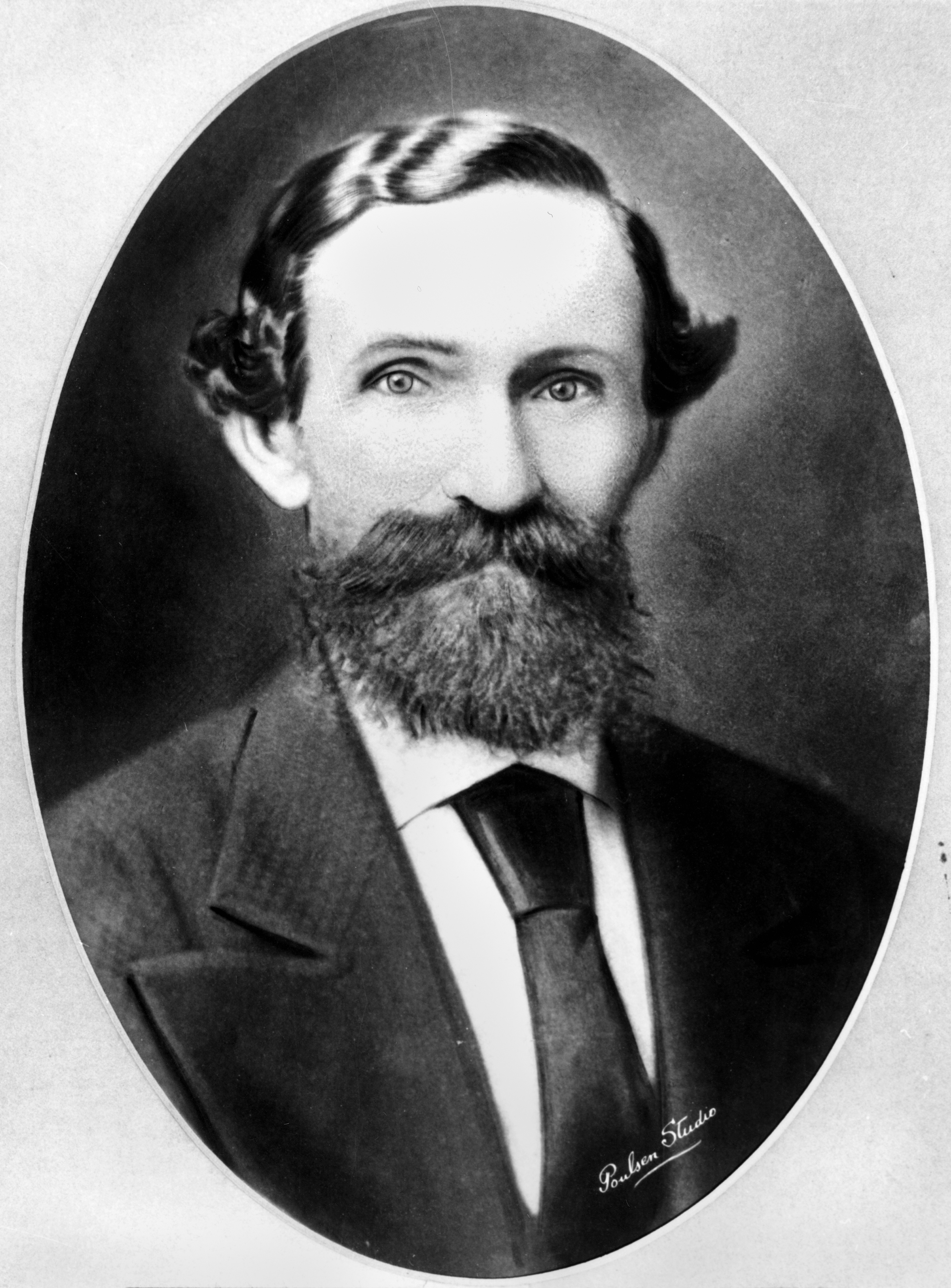

Member of the Queensland Legislative Assembly for Kennedy
- In office 25 November 1873 – 28 November 1878
- Preceded by: Edward MacDevitt
- Succeeded by: Henry Palmer

Member of the Queensland Legislative Assembly for Townsville
- In office 4 March 1879 – 30 March 1891 Serving with William Brown, Robert Philp
- Preceded by: John Deane
- Succeeded by: William Brown

Personal details
- Born: John Murtagh Macrossan; 1832 Creeslough, County Donegal, Ireland
- Died: 30 March 1891 (aged 58–59) Sydney, Australia
- Resting place: Nudgee Cemetery
- Spouse: Bridget Queely
- Relations: Hugh Denis Macrossan (son), Neal Macrossan (son), John Murtagh Macrossan (grandson)
- Occupation: Goldminer, Catholic lay leader

John Murtagh Macrossan (1832 – 30 March 1891) was an Australian politician of the late 19th century in the parliament of Queensland.

== Early and parliamentary life ==
Macrossan was born in County Donegal, Ireland. He moved to the colony of Victoria at the age of 21 to work on the gold diggings. Twelve years later he moved to North Queensland where he became well known among the miners. In 1873 he organised the Ravenswood Miners Protection Association.

In 1873, was elected a member of the Queensland Legislative Assembly for the Kennedy electoral district. He championed the causes of regulation of the mining industry and Separatism of North Queensland as a separate colony. From January 1879 he was member for Townsville and secretary for public works and for mines in the first and second McIlwraith Ministries. In January 1890 Macrossan became the Colonial Secretary in the Morehead government.

== Mining ==
In the first McIlwraith Ministry, Macrossan successfully introduced the first mining regulations in Queensland on his third attempt in 1881. In 1889 Macrossan expanded upon this success by introducing new regulations which included provisions for a system of inspections by representatives of the miners.

== Self-government of northern Queensland and Australian Federation ==
After advocating on the issue for many years, in October 1890 Macrossan brought forward a motion to bring about the separation of the north. Then Premier Samuel Griffith moved an amendment that it was desirable to have separate legislative authorities in southern, northern and central Queensland, which was carried. However, in the 1890s Regionalism became less of a focus as Federalism became closer to attainment. In February 1890 Macrossan attended the conference on federation held at Melbourne with Griffith, who was then leader of the opposition, and in 1891 he was one of the Queensland representatives to the first Constitutional Convention.

Four weeks after the conference opened he died, on 30 March 1891. Following a funeral at St Stephen's Cathedral, Macrossan was buried in Nudgee Cemetery.

Parliament of Queensland
Preceded by Edward MacDevitt	Member for Kennedy; 1873–1878	Succeeded by Henry Palmer
Preceded by John Deane	Member for Townsville; 1879–1891; Served alongside: William Brown, Robert Philp	Succeeded by William Brown
