= Mandy Johnstone =

Australian politician

Member of the Queensland Legislative Assembly for Townsville
- In office 21 March 2009 – 23 March 2012
- Preceded by: Mike Reynolds
- Succeeded by: John Hathaway

Personal details
- Born: 30 September 1972 (age 54) Townsville, Queensland, Australia
- Party: Labor
- Education: James Cook University
- Occupation: Consultant

Amanda Ann Johnstone (born 30 September 1972) is an Australian politician who was a Labor Party member of the Legislative Assembly of Queensland from 2009 to 2012 representing Townsville. Mandy Johnstone is also the first female politician elected to the seat of Townsville.

Before entering parliament, Johnstone unsuccessfully ran as a Labor candidate in the 2008 Townsville City Council election.

Parliament of Queensland
Preceded by Mike Reynolds	Member for Townsville; 2009–2012	Succeeded by John Hathaway
