= John Deane (Australian politician) =

Australian politician

The Hon John Deane

Member of the Queensland Legislative Assembly for Townsville
- In office 28 November 1878 – 3 February 1879
- Preceded by: New seat
- Succeeded by: John Macrossan

Member of the Queensland Legislative Council
- In office 31 July 1889 – 27 October 1913

Personal details
- Born: John Horace Deane; 1 July 1842 Cootehill, Cavan, Ireland
- Died: 27 October 1913 (aged 71) Townsville, Queensland, Australia
- Resting place: West End Cemetery
- Spouse: Mary Ann Gologly (m.1864 d.1917)
- Occupation: Butcher, Grazier, Exporter, Gold mine owner

John Horace Deane was a miner, pastoralist and politician in Queensland, Australia. He was a Member of the Queensland Legislative Assembly and a Member of the Queensland Legislative Council.

== Early life ==
He was born on 24 January 1842 at Cootehill, County Cavan, Ireland, the son of George Deane, farmer, and his wife Elizabeth, née Mahood. He was employed in farming and building before migrating to Queensland, arriving in June 1863.

He tried gold mining at Peak Downs before becoming a storekeeper at Lilydale, Queensland. Later he moved to Townsville where became a successful publican and butcher.

In 1868, he moved to the Ravenswood goldfield where he erected an ore crushing battery that served the gold miners in the area.

== Politics ==
John Deane was a member of the Dalrymple Shire Council from 1880 to 1889 and from 1891 to 1911. During that period, he was chairman of the Council from 1880 to 1884 and again in 1890.

Deane was elected to the Queensland Legislative Assembly in the electoral district of Townsville in the 1878 election on 28 November 1878 as a supporter of Thomas McIlwraith. He never spoke in parliament and resigned on 3 February 1879, standing aside to allow John Murtagh Macrossan (who had already been appointed Minister for Works and Mines in the McIlwraith Ministry) to win the resulting by-election on 4 March 1879.

On 31 July 1889, Deane was appointed to the Queensland Legislative Council. A lifetime appointment, he held it until his death on 27 October 1913.

== Later life ==
Dean died on 27 October 1913 and was buried in Townsville's West End Cemetery.

Parliament of Queensland
New seat	Member for Townsville; 1878–1879	Succeeded by John Macrossan
