= John Hathaway (Australian politician) =

Australian politician

Member of the Queensland Legislative Assembly for Townsville
- In office 24 March 2012 – 31 January 2015
- Preceded by: Mandy Johnstone
- Succeeded by: Scott Stewart

Personal details
- Born: 2 May 1964 (age 62) Sydney, New South Wales, Australia
- Party: Liberal National Party
- Education: University of New South Wales
- Occupation: Army officer

John Damien Hathaway (born 2 May 1964) is an Australian Liberal National politician who was the member of the Legislative Assembly of Queensland for Townsville from 2012 to 2015.

Parliament of Queensland
Preceded by Mandy Johnstone	Member for Townsville; 2012–2015	Succeeded by Scott Stewart
