= Daniel Ryan (Queensland politician) =

Australian politician

Member of the Queensland Legislative Assembly for Townsville
- In office 22 May 1915 – 9 October 1920
- Preceded by: Robert Philp
- Succeeded by: William Green

Personal details
- Born: Daniel Ryan; 4 April 1865 Rockhampton, Queensland, Australia
- Died: 11 December 1952 (aged 87) Brisbane, Queensland, Australia
- Resting place: Toowong Cemetery
- Party: Labor Party
- Spouse(s): Gertrude Mary Fogarty (m.1889 d.1902), Eleanor Marion Fogarty (m.1908 d.1942),
- Occupation: Reporter

Daniel Ryan (4 April 1865 – 11 December 1952) was a member of the Queensland Legislative Assembly.

== Biography ==
Ryan was born in Rockhampton, Queensland, the son of Michael Ryan and his wife Anastasia (née Coohey). He was educated in Melbourne and Bendigo and after finishing his schooling worked as a reporter for the Bendigo Advertiser. After his defeat in politics he worked for the Public Curator's Office in Brisbane as a valuator.

On 18 May 1889 he married Gertrude Mary Fogarty in Townsville and together had a son and four daughters. Gertrude died in 1902 and in 1908 Ryan married Gertrude's sister, Eleanor Marion Fogarty (died 1942). He died in Brisbane in December 1952 and his funeral proceeded from St Finbarr's Catholic Church, Ashgrove, to the Toowong Cemetery.

== Public career ==
At the 1915 Queensland state election Ryan won the seat of Townsville for the Labor Party, defeating Robert Philp, who had represented the electorate since 1888 and was the Premier of Queensland on two separate occasions. Ryan went on to hold the seat until the 1920 Queensland state election when he was defeated by William Green of the Northern Country Party.

Parliament of Queensland
Preceded by Robert Philp	Member for Townsville; 1915–1920	Succeeded by William Green
