= Electoral district of Townsville =

State electoral district of Queensland, Australia

Townsville Queensland—Legislative Assembly
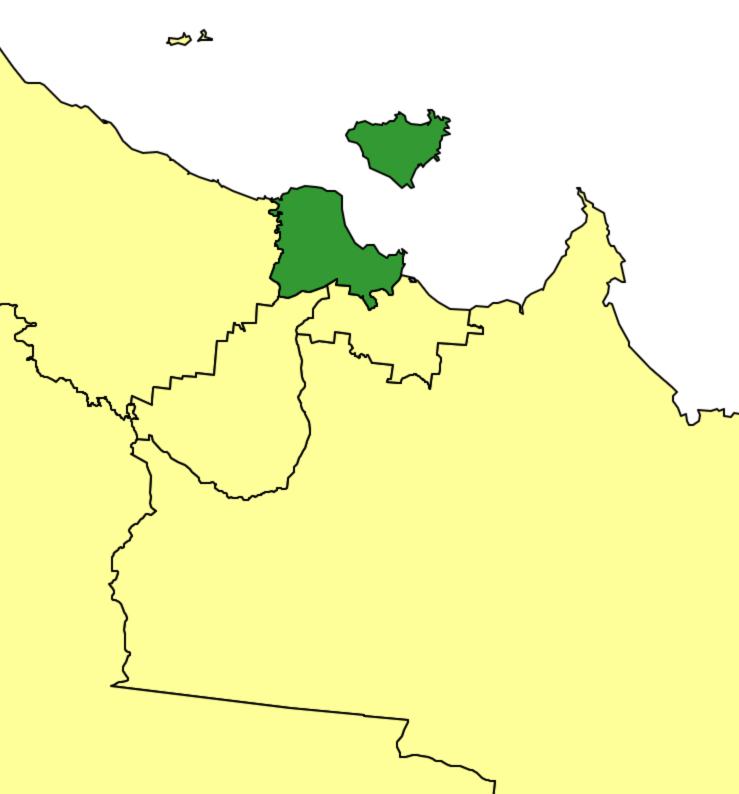
- Electoral map of Townsville, 2024
- State: Queensland
- Dates current: 1878–present
- MP: Adam Baillie
- Party: Liberal National
- Namesake: Townsville
- Electors: 35,337 (2020)
- Area: 251 km^{2} (96.9 sq mi)
- Demographic: Provincial
- Coordinates: 18°55′S 146°41′E
Electorates around Townsville:
| Hinchinbrook | Coral Sea | Coral Sea |
| Hinchinbrook | Townsville | Coral Sea |
| Thuringowa | Mundingburra | Mundingburra |

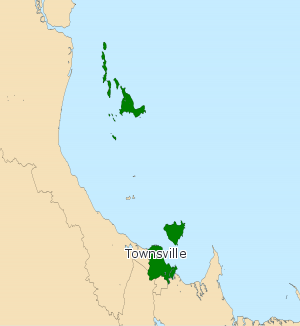
Electoral map of Townsville 2008

Townsville is an electoral district of the Legislative Assembly in the Australian state of Queensland. The seat is one of four within the Townsville urban area in North Queensland, and covers the Eastern and Northern suburbs of the City of Townsville as well as Magnetic Island and Palm Island.

Significant features in Townsville within the electorate are; The Strand, the Port of Townsville, Townsville Airport, RAAF Garbutt, Castle Hill, Museum of Tropical Queensland, Reef HQ, various administrative centres for Local, State and federal Governments. Suburbs of Townsville within the Electorate include; Townsville, North Ward, Castle Hill, Belgian Gardens, West End, Hyde Park, Garbutt, Mount Louisa, Currajong, Railway Estate, South Townsville, Rowes Bay, Bohle and Pallarenda. Two populated islands fall within the electorate; Magnetic Island and Palm Island, each have about 2500 residents, 93% of Palm Island's inhabitants are Indigenous.

This State electorate falls completely within the eastern portion of the Federal Division of Herbert. It encompasses the local government areas of Palm Island and parts of Townsville.

Townsville Electorate is bordered by the Hinchinbrook (North), Burdekin (South), Mundingburra (South and West) and Thuringowa (West) Electorates.

== History ==
The Electoral district of Townsville was created in 1878, then the Additional Members Act of 1885 (which took effect late 1885 / early 1886) was divided in two, one retaining the name of Townsville, the other becoming Musgrave which existed until 1923. From late 1885 it was determined that the Townsville Electorate would elect two representatives to the Legislative Assembly.

Premier Robert Philp (Premier 1899–1903 and 1907–08) was elected as one of the two Townsville members when his previous Electorate of Musgrave absorbed. His parliamentary activity was mainly in support of North Queensland and his own business interests - extending railway links to North Queensland, and the abolition of import tariffs. When the import of Pacific Islanders was temporarily halted in 1892 Philp was instrumental in securing its resumption.

In 1912 the Electoral district of Mundingburra was created to accommodate for the return to universal single member electorates. 1923 saw the further reduction in size of the Electorate with the northern part of the city ceded to Kennedy and the southern part to Mundingburra, and in 1959 it was abolished and divided into the two electorates of Townsville South and Townsville North. The 1971 redistribution recreated the Electorate with new neighbours, Townsville West and Townsville South, Townsville included most of the Northern part of the City and some rural areas which were formerly in Hinchinbrook. The Electorate was reduced in size again in 1986 redistribution with a new neighbour of Townsville East. When Townsville East was abolished in 1991 Townsville Electorate gained land but lost land in the South-West corner to the newly re-created seat of Mundingburra.

In 1998 Mike Reyolds was elected as the new Member for the Townsville Electorate taking over from retiring Labor Member Ken Geoff Smith and was immediately appointed Parliamentary Secretary to the Premier in North Queensland. After increasing the Townsville margin in 2001 Reynolds was promoted to Cabinet as Minister for Emergency Services and Minister Assisting the Premier in North Queensland. In 2004, Reynolds was moved to the new Child Safety Ministry with Ministerial responsibilities for adoptions, child protection services, foster/kinship carers etc.

After the 2006 election, Reynolds was elected as Speaker of the Legislative Assembly of Queensland by the 52nd Parliament on 10 October 2006.

== Members for Townsville ==
First incarnation (1878–1885, 1 member)
| Member | Party | Term |
|---|---|---|
| John Deane | Unaligned | 1878–1879 |
| John Murtagh Macrossan | Unaligned | 1879–1885 |
Second incarnation (1885–1912, 2 members)
| Member | Party | Term |
| John Murtagh Macrossan | Unaligned | 1885–1891 |
| William Villiers Brown | Unaligned | 1885–1888 |
| Robert Philp | Opposition/Ministerialist | 1888–1912 |
| William Villiers Brown | Unaligned | 1891–1893 |
| George Burns | Ministerialist | 1893 |
| Anthony Ogden | Labour | 1894–1896 |
| William Castling | Ministerialist | 1896–1899 |
| Patrick Hanran | Ministerialist | 1899–1909 |
| Thomas Foley | Labour | 1909–1912 |
Third incarnation (1912–1960, 1 member)
| Member | Party | Term |
| Robert Philp | Opposition/Ministerialist | 1912–1915 |
| Daniel Ryan | Labor | 1915–1920 |
| William Green | Northern Country | 1920–1923 |
| Maurice Hynes | Labor | 1923–1939 |
| George Keyatta | Labor | 1939–1960 |
Fourth incarnation (1972–present, 1 member)
| Member | Party | Term |
| Norman Scott-Young | Liberal | 1972–1983 |
| Ken McElligott | Labor | 1983–1986 |
| Tony Burreket | National | 1986–1989 |
| Ken Davies | Labor | 1989–1992 |
| Geoff Smith | Labor | 1992–1998 |
| Mike Reynolds | Labor | 1998–2009 |
| Mandy Johnstone | Labor | 2009–2012 |
| John Hathaway | Liberal National | 2012–2015 |
| Scott Stewart | Labor | 2015–2024 |
| Adam Baillie | Liberal National | 2024–present |

== Election results ==
2024 Queensland state election: Townsville
| Party | Candidate | Votes | % | ±% |
|---|---|---|---|---|
| Liberal National | Adam Baillie | 12,346 | 41.24 | +7.79 |
| Labor | Scott Stewart | 8,921 | 29.80 | −6.40 |
| Katter's Australian | Margie Ryder | 3,770 | 12.59 | +1.02 |
| Greens | Benjamin Tiley | 2,428 | 8.11 | −0.21 |
| One Nation | Alan Butt | 1,222 | 4.08 | −0.47 |
| Independent | Wesley Newman | 744 | 2.49 | +2.49 |
| Family First | William Tento | 505 | 1.69 | +1.69 |
| Total formal votes | | 29,936 | 95.86 | +0.82 |
| Informal votes | | 1,294 | 4.14 | −0.82 |
| Turnout | | 31,230 | 82.46 | −2.18 |
Two-party-preferred result
| Liberal National | Adam Baillie | 16,644 | 55.60 | +8.72 |
| Labor | Scott Stewart | 13,292 | 44.40 | −8.72 |
| Liberal National gain from Labor | | Swing | +8.72 | |

Primary vote results in Townsville (Fourth Incarnation) (Parties that did not get 5% of the vote are omitted)
Labor
Liberal National

Liberal
Country/National

Greens
One Nation
Katter's Australian
Palmer United/United Australia Party
Queensland Labor
Independent
View source data.
Two-candidate-preferred vote results in Townsville (Fourth Incarnation) View source data.
