= Anthony Ogden =

Australian politician

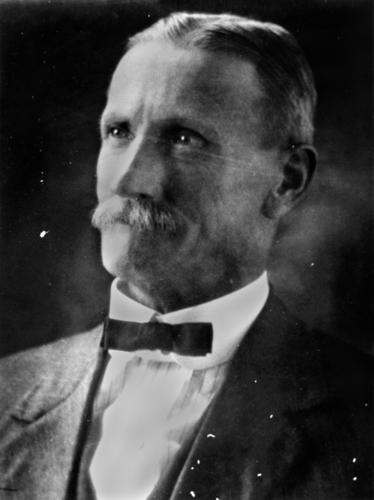

Member of the Queensland Legislative Assembly for Townsville
- In office 20 January 1894 – 21 March 1896 Serving with Robert Philp
- Preceded by: George Burns
- Succeeded by: William Castling

Mayor of Townsville
- In office 1924–1926
- Preceded by: William Green
- Succeeded by: William John Heatley

Personal details
- Born: Anthony Ogden; 18 March 1866 Grenoside, Yorkshire, England
- Died: 15 May 1943 (aged 77) Townsville, Queensland, Australia
- Resting place: West End Cemetery
- Party: Labour Party
- Spouse: Mary Ann Gillott (m.1888 d.1920)
- Occupation: Meatworker

Anthony Ogden (18 March 1866 – 15 May 1943) was a member of the Queensland Legislative Assembly.

== Biography ==
Ogden was born in Grenoside, Yorkshire, the son of Anthony Ogden Snr. and his wife Ann (née Housley) and was educated in Sheffield. On leaving school he was an apprentice iron moulder before arriving in Queensland in 1884. He was a meatworker and later worked in a foundry and on the wharves of Townsville. He studied for the Wesleyan Church and at one stage was a local preacher.

On 19 November 1888 he married Mary Ann Gillott (died 1920) and together had two sons and five daughters. Ogden died at Townsville in May 1943 and was buried in the West End Cemetery.

== Public career ==
Having lost the 1893 Queensland colonial election by one vote, Ogden won the 1894 by-election for the seat of Townsville in the Queensland Legislative Assembly, defeating his Ministerialist opponent, Mr Willmett. He was the first candidate in Queensland to run on an official Labour Party platform. He was defeated two years later at the 1896 Queensland colonial election by the two Ministerial candidates, Robert Philp and William Castling.

He was a long-term alderman on the Townsville City Council and in 1924 he became the city's mayor, holding the role until 1926. He unsuccessfully ran for mayor again in 1933.

Ogden was the secretary of the Meatworker's Union and the Watersiders' Federation of Australia. A prohibitionist, he was also the editor of Townsville Clarion.

Parliament of Queensland
Preceded by George Burns	Member for Townsville; 1894–1896; Served alongside: Robert Philp	Succeeded by William Castling
