= Adam Baillie =

Australian politician

Adam Baillie MP

Member of the Queensland Legislative Assembly for Townsville
- Incumbent
- Assumed office 26 October 2024
- Preceded by: Scott Stewart

Personal details
- Born: 3 January 1982 (age 44)
- Party: Liberal National

Adam Baillie (born 3 January 1982) is an Australian politician. He was elected a member of the Legislative Assembly of Queensland for Townsville in the 2024 Queensland state election. Baillie is a local small business owner.

He is married and has three children.
