= Norman Scott-Young =

Australian politician

Member of the Queensland Legislative Assembly for Townsville
- In office 27 May 1972 – 22 October 1983
- Preceded by: New seat
- Succeeded by: Ken McElligott

Personal details
- Born: Norman Reginald Scott-Young; 8 January 1917 Sydney, New South Wales, Australia
- Died: 29 August 1996 (aged 79) Brisbane, Queensland, Australia
- Party: Liberal Party
- Spouse: Olive Orme Johnston (m.1960)
- Education: University of Sydney
- Occupation: Surgeon

Norman Reginald Scott-Young (8 January 1917 – 29 August 1996) was a member of the Queensland Legislative Assembly.

== Biography ==
Scott-Young was born in Sydney, New South Wales, the son of Reginald Charles Scott-Young and his wife Mary (née Crotty). He was educated at the Marist Brothers College in North Sydney and Saint Ignatius' College in Sydney before attending the University of Sydney. In 1941 he was a resident medical officer at the Royal Prince Alfred Hospital before joining the Second Australian Imperial Force in World War II where he served with the 2/3 Commando Squadron. By the time he was discharged in July 1946 he had reached the rank of captain.

He went back to the Royal Prince Alfred Hospital as the senior resident pathologist and in 1947 was a surgical associate there. The next year Scott-Young joined the staff of the University of Sydney as a teaching fellow in the Department of Physiology. 1953 saw him in Townsville, as the medical superintendent, Townsville General Hospital, where he stayed until 1970. During this time he was also the leader of the Vietnam Surgical Team in Bien Hoa in 1968 and 1969. Finally, he was the consulting surgeon at the Townsville General Hospital from 1970 to 1976.

As a youngster he had been a successful boxer at university and in the Army and was a former Australian universities heavyweight champion. He even fought a few professional bouts to put himself through his studies until his mother found out and put a stop to it.

On 20 February 1960 Scott-Young married Olive Orme Johnston and together had two sons and six daughters. One of his sons, Sam Scott-Young represented Australia in rugby union. Norman Scott-Young died in August 1996 and was cremated at the Mt Thompson Crematorium.

== Public career ==
At the 1972 Queensland state election, Scott-Young won the re-established seat of Townsville. He went on to represent the electorate until 1983 where he lost to the Labor candidate, Ken McElligott. He became renowned for his attacks on the Premier of the day, Sir Joh Bjelke-Petersen, and crossed the floor on occasions to vote with the ALP opposition. It was felt that this streak of independence prevented him from ever being appointed to the ministry. His wife, Olive, was known to publicise the size of the potholes in Townsville streets by sitting in them and being photographed by the local newspaper.

Parliament of Queensland
New seat	Member for Townsville; 1972–1983	Succeeded by Ken McElligott
