= Scott Stewart (politician) =

Australian politician in Queensland

The Honourable Scott Stewart MP

Minister for Resources and Critical Minerals
- In office 18 December 2023 – 26 October 2024
- Premier: Steven Miles
- Preceded by: Himself (as Minister for Resources)
- Succeeded by: Dale Last (as Minister for Natural Resources and Mines)

Minister for Resources
- In office 12 November 2020 – 18 December 2023
- Premier: Annastacia Palaszczuk; Steven Miles
- Preceded by: Position established
- Succeeded by: Himself (as Minister for Resources and Critical Minerals)

Deputy Speaker of the Queensland Legislative Assembly
- In office 15 February 2018 – 11 November 2020
- Speaker: Curtis Pitt
- Succeeded by: Joe Kelly

Deputy Speaker of the Queensland Legislative Assembly
- Temporary
- In office 14 February 2017 – 14 February 2018
- Speaker: Peter Wellington; Curtis Pitt

Member of the Queensland Legislative Assembly for Townsville
- In office 31 January 2015 – 26 October 2024
- Preceded by: John Hathaway
- Succeeded by: Adam Baillie

Personal details
- Born: Home Hill, Queensland, Australia
- Party: Labor
- Spouse: Jackie
- Children: 3
- Occupation: Principal; Politician
- Website: www.scottstewartmp.org.au

Scott James Stewart is an Australian politician. He served as the Labor member for Townsville in the Queensland Legislative Assembly from 2015 until his defeat in the 2024 state election.

Stewart was a high school principal and educator in the Townsville region. He was the principal of Pimlico State High School when he contested the seat of Townsville.

During his time in education, Scott established a boxing program, aimed at helping under-achieving indigenous students re-engage with schooling through sport.

Scott and his wife Jackie moved to Townsville in 1999 to raise their three children. He is a volunteer with Townsville Rotary and sits on several committees including the North Queensland Stadium Activation Group, Community Aviation Consultation Group, CBD Taskforce, Regional Economic Development Sub-Committee, Palm Island Economic Development and Palm Island Liveability Project.

Scott holds a Bachelor of Education and a Master's degree from the Queensland University of Technology.

On 12 November 2020 he was appointed Minister for Resources.

Parliament of Queensland
| Preceded by John Hathaway | Member for Townsville; 2015–2024 | Succeeded by Adam Baillie |
