= William Castling =

Australian politician

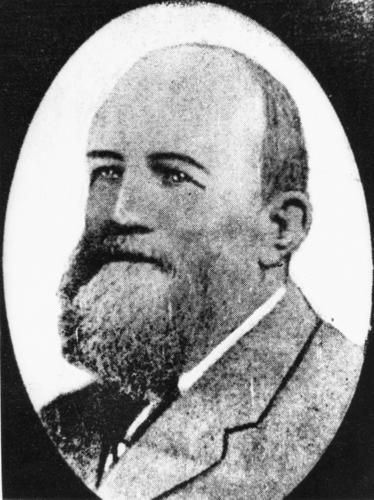

Member of the Queensland Legislative Assembly for Townsville
- In office 21 March 1896 – 11 March 1899 Serving with Robert Philp
- Preceded by: Anthony Ogden
- Succeeded by: Patrick Hanran

Personal details
- Born: William Joseph Castling; 1838 Northallerton, Yorkshire, England
- Died: 7 June 1906 (aged 68) Townsville, Queensland, Australia
- Resting place: West End Cemetery
- Party: Ministerialist
- Spouse: Mary Townsend (m.1872 d.1892)
- Occupation: Butcher

William Joseph Castling (1838 – 7 June 1906) was a member of the Queensland Legislative Assembly.

== Biography ==
Castling was born in Northallerton, Yorkshire, the son of Robert Castling and his wife Jane (née Haw) and was educated in Ipswich. He arrived at Dalrymple, Queensland in 1863 and worked the goldfields in the area before purchasing a half share in a Townsville wholesale butchery in 1876 which by 1880 employed 40 people.

On 11 November 1872 he married Mary Townsend in Townsville and together had 5 sons and 4 daughters. Castling drowned in Ross Creek in Townsville in June 1906 and was buried in the West End Cemetery.

== Public career ==
Castling won the junior position in the two-member seat of Townsville for the Ministerialists at the 1896 Queensland colonial election. He represented the electorate for three years and did not stand at the 1899 Queensland colonial election.

Parliament of Queensland
| Preceded by Anthony Ogden | Member for Townsville; 1896–1899; Served alongside: Robert Philp | Succeeded by Patrick Hanran |
