= William Green (Australian politician) =

Australian politician (1878–1968)

William Green OBE
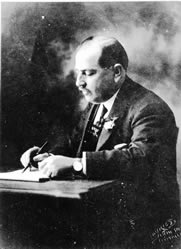

Member of the Queensland Legislative Assembly for Townsville
- In office 9 October 1920 – 12 May 1923
- Preceded by: Daniel Ryan
- Succeeded by: Maurice Hynes

Personal details
- Born: William Herbert Green; 11 October 1878 Brisbane, Queensland, Australia
- Died: 18 March 1968 (aged 89) Brisbane, Queensland, Australia
- Resting place: Toowong Cemetery
- Party: Northern Country Party
- Spouse(s): Clara Cockerill (m.1903 d.1930), Frances Gertude Cockerill (m.1933 d.1939), Georgina Singleton (m.1948 d.1995)
- Occupation: Chemist

William Herbert Green (11 October 1878 – 18 March 1968) was a member of the Queensland Legislative Assembly in Australia.

== Biography ==
Green was born in Brisbane, Queensland, the son of Charles Green, ironfounder, and his wife Eliza (née Vaughan). After his father became a partner in a Mackay foundry in 1881, he was educated at Mackay State School and completed his schooling at the Way Methodist College in Adelaide. He was apprenticed in 1896 to Townsville pharmacist, Cromwell Ridgley before attending the Queensland College of Pharmacy in Brisbane in 1901. He then returned to Townsville and bought Ridgley's business and by 1914 owned four chemists. By 1920 W. H. Green Ltd owned eight chemists across Northern Queensland and eventually the company controlled sixteen pharmacies but the Pharmacy Act of 1933 requiring professional managers forced the company to disband.

Later in life Green was chairman of the Equitable Probate and General Insurance Co. Ltd and the Indooroopilly Toll Bridge Co. He was also a director of the Atlas Insurance Company and Busby's Ltd. During World War I Green served for three and a half months on Thursday Island as sergeant-compounder with the Kennedy Regiment of the Citizen Forces.

On 29 October 1903 in Townsville Green married Clara Cockerill in Townsville and together had two sons and three daughters. Clara died in 1930 and three years later he married Clara's sister, Frances Gertude Cockerill (died 1939) in Brisbane. His final marriage was to Georgina Singleton on 4 October 1948 in Glasgow while on a visit to Scotland. He died in Brisbane in March 1968 and was buried in the Toowong Cemetery.

== Public career ==
Green was an alderman on the Townsville City Council and became the city's mayor in 1920, holding the title for three years. He won the seat of Townsville for the Northern Country Party at the 1920 Queensland state election, defeating the sitting Labor member, Daniel Ryan. He held the seat for three years before his defeat at the 1923 Queensland state election to the Labor candidate, Maurice Hynes.

Like his father, Green was a Methodist lay-preacher for over 55 years and the superintendent of a Sunday school for thirty-five years. He was also the treasurer of the Methodist King's College at the University of Queensland for 25 years and a foundation member and president of the interdenominational Queensland Council of Churches. He was a lifelong supporter of the temperance movement. In 1940 was the treasurer of the Queensland Temperance League and in 1965 was its chairman and represented Australia at international temperance conferences.

Green was also a Freemason, joining in 1905 and went on to become the district grand master of North Queensland in 1922 and state grand master in 1929–30 and 1932–33. In 1931 and 1935–45 he was pro-grand master under the governor. He was appointed O.B.E. in 1958 for his numerous church projects, charitable works and donations. On 10 December 1930 as Most Worshipful Grand Master he opened and dedicated the new Masonic Temple in Brisbane.

Parliament of Queensland
Preceded by Daniel Ryan	Member for Townsville; 1920–1923	Succeeded by Maurice Hynes
