= West End Cemetery =

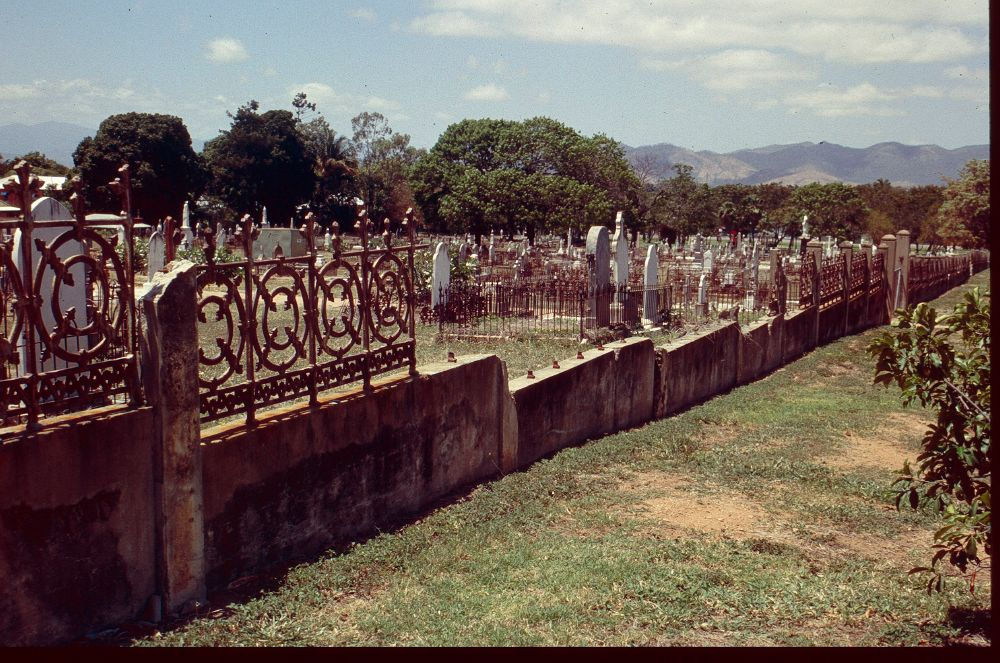
- West End Cemetery

- Location within Queensland Location within Australia
- 19.266°S 146.8019°E
- Location: Francis Street, West End, City of Townsville, Queensland, Australia

History
- Design period: 1840s–1860s (mid-19th century)
- Built: 1865–1930s

Queensland Heritage Register
- Official name: West End Cemetery, Townsville General Cemetery
- Type: state heritage (built, landscape)
- Designated: 4 June 1996
- Reference no.: 601475
- Significant period: 1865– (social); 1865–1930s (fabric, historical)
- Significant components: headstone, grave surrounds/railings, pathway/walkway, memorial/monument, cemetery, denominational divisions, burial/grave, tree groups – avenue of, fence/wall – perimeter

West End Cemetery is a heritage-listed cemetery at Francis Street, West End, City of Townsville, Queensland, Australia. It was built from 1865 to 1930s. It is also known as Townsville General Cemetery. It was added to the Queensland Heritage Register on 4 June 1996.

== History ==
West End Cemetery, surveyed in 1865, was Townsville's first official cemetery and second burial ground. The first burial ground was located north of the main settlement along the beach in North Ward, but this was abandoned within a couple of years as settlement spread rapidly north around Castle Hill. It was not an officially gazetted cemetery, and was not included in the first town plan of Townsville, completed early in 1865.

The first official Townsville General Cemetery (West End Cemetery) was surveyed along with Townsville's first suburban allotments, west of the main settlement on Ross Creek, in November 1865. It comprised 19 acres of Suburban Section 1 at the base of Castle Hill, and was bounded by unmade road reserves to the west, north and east, and separated from the main track into Townsville (later Flinders Street West) by private allotments. Although not officially gazetted as a cemetery reserve until 1872, the burial ground was used from at least March 1868 when Captain Henry Daniel Sinclair, founder of Bowen, was buried there.

Prior to 1872 there was no official administration of the West End Cemetery. In 1868 a committee was established to raise funds to fence the cemetery, and this was completed by July 1869, but there were no trustees and no burial register was being kept. Finally, in August 1872, the Townsville Cemetery Reserve at West End was gazetted and trustees were appointed, following which cemetery rules were gazetted in July 1873 and a burial register established later that year.

Prior to 1880, access to the cemetery was over privately owned land between Flinders Street West and the reserve. In June 1880 the trustees succeeded in having the cemetery reserve extended to include Lot 1 of Suburban Section 1, a 4-acre allotment adjoining the cemetery and fronting Flinders Street West, in order to create official access to the cemetery from the main road into Townsville. However, this extension was cancelled in 1884 and the land reserved for school purposes. In 1886 the southeast corner of the original cemetery reserve was excised for school reserve as well, and new access to the main road was established with the addition to the cemetery of Lot 4 of Suburban Section 1 (5 acres at the corner of Church Street and Flinders Street West).

When surveyed in 1865, the cemetery was well outside the town boundaries. However, within a decade settlement was developing around the Carriers Arms Hotel at what had become known as Townsville's West End. By 1878 a soap works, foundry and commercial buildings, together with Frederick Ashton's estate, were located close to the burial site, now situated within the town boundaries. By the 1890s West End was a thriving suburb as well as a commercial and business centre, and a state school had been established on the reserve at the corner of Wilson and Flinders Street West, adjacent to the cemetery.

As the suburb grew concern was expressed that the cemetery was badly located at the base of Castle Hill. The community was worried that rainwater leaching from the hill was likely to contaminate a nearby creek, and in the 1890s the trustees searched for an alternative location for Townsville's general cemetery. On 10 November 1900 a new cemetery reserve of 100 acres at Belgian Gardens, on the Townsville Town Common, was proclaimed. The sale of burial plots at West End Cemetery ceased in 1902, but the cemetery was not closed at this time.

With the establishment of the new cemetery at Belgian Gardens, lack of revenue for maintenance at the West End Cemetery became a major issue. In 1901 the trustees relinquished the unfenced part of the cemetery, about 3 acres at the corner of Flinders Street West and Church Street, reducing the size of the cemetery reserve to 16 acres. The excised land was gazetted a recreation reserve, administered by the Townsville Municipal Council. However, in 1910 the recreation reserve (minus a road reserve – now Pridmore Street) was returned to the cemetery reserve, the Council having failed to carry out improvements. It remained a constant source of annoyance to the cemetery trustees that their resources were being spent on maintaining ground which did not contain graves. However, the new road reserve created formal access from Flinders Street West to the main entrance gate and tree lined road through the cemetery.

West End Cemetery was closed officially in 1930, with only previously purchased plots used for burials after that time. Since 1930 up to 288 people have been buried in family graves at West End. Further changes to the cemetery boundary were made in 1935 when 3 acres, excised from the north east corner, was added to the adjacent school reserve.

During the Second World War a Civil Construction Corp camp was established on the unfenced section of the cemetery reserve at the corner of Church Street and Flinders Street West. It is believed that the cemetery entrance gates and turnstile at the end of Pridmore Street were removed at this time and a new entrance created off Church Street. This unfenced area was again excised from the cemetery reserve in 1958 to create the present recreation reserve. Since that time the cemetery reserve has comprised just under 15 acres.

Two important firms of monumental masons working in Townsville made significant contributions to the monumental architecture in the West End Cemetery. From the late 19th century until 1984, Melrose and Fenwick produced both headstones and wrought iron grave surrounds; Whebells, operating from the late 19th century to the 1950s, made headstones.

On 24 December 1971 Cyclone Althea caused considerable damage to headstones and trees at West End Cemetery, and vandalism and neglect have added to the damage. However, in recent years the local community has campaigned for the cemetery to be preserved, and in 1996 the Townsville City Council commissioned the preparation of a conservation policy to give direction and guidelines for the future care and maintenance of West End Cemetery.

== Description ==
West End Cemetery, Townsville is located on the southern slope of Castle Hill and is bounded to the north by unmade road reserve (Francis Street), on the west by Church Street, on the south by a recreation reserve fronting Flinders Street West and residential allotments fronting Norman and Musgrave Streets, and on the east by a school reserve.

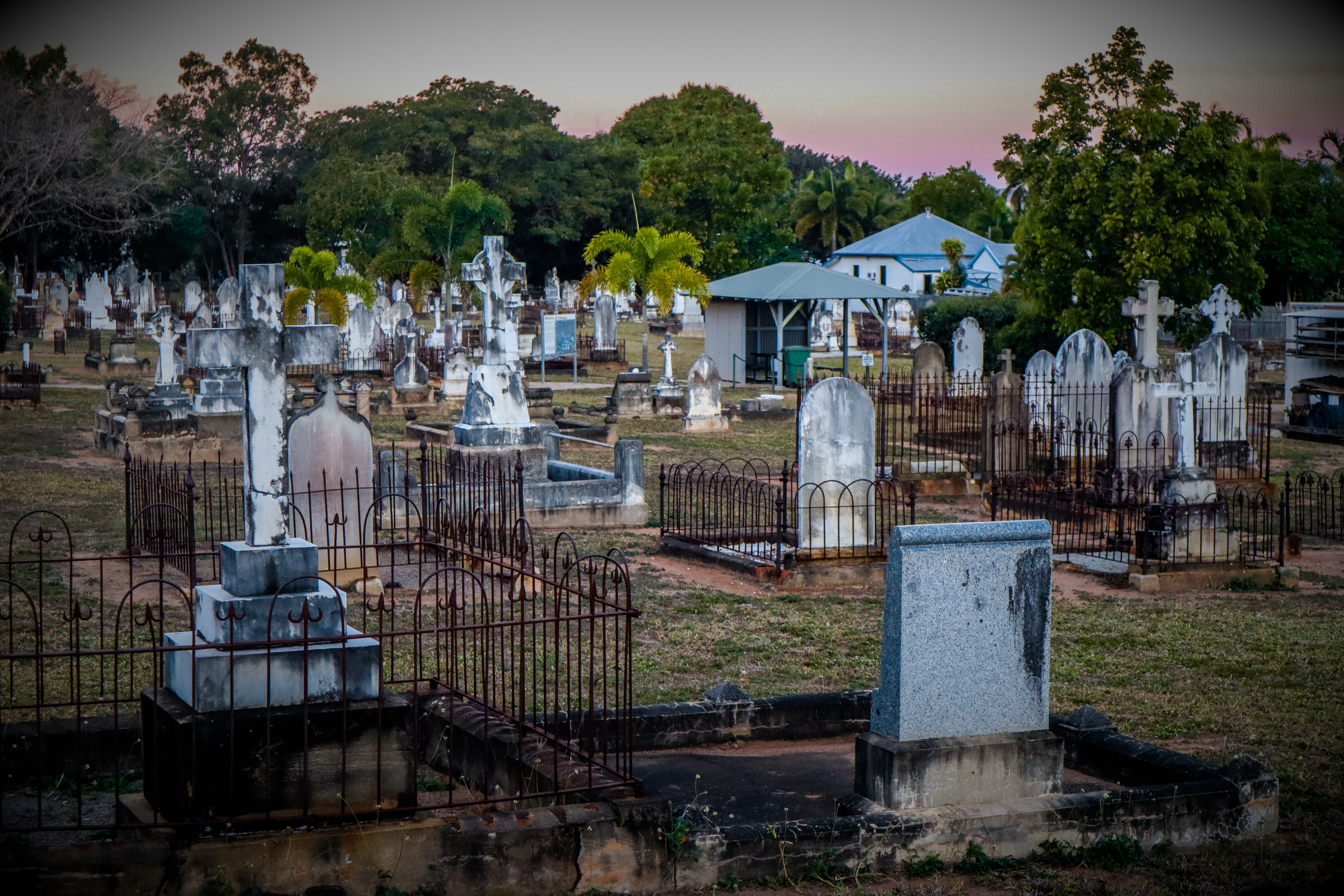
The West End Cemetery in July 2019

The site is dissected east–west by two unmade paths, dividing the cemetery into Blocks A and C to the south, Block B between the paths, and Block D to the north. These paths meet a creek running through the eastern side of the cemetery. Between the creek and the school reserve on the eastern boundary is Block E, which was reserved for unsanctified burials. The graves of Chinese, Jewish and Aboriginal people as well as members of lodges and those who committed suicide are buried in this section. Only a small number of headstones remain in Block E and it is possible some graves have been washed away during floods because cast iron and headstone fragments can be found in the creek. Unlike many cemeteries, West End, with the exception of the unsanctified section across the creek, is not divided into denominational sections. However, all graves are oriented to the east in usual fashion.

Large banyan, fig and mango trees are the main plantings. An avenue of mahogany trees, running north–south from the adjacent recreation reserve, marks the original entrance off the end of Pridmore Street. There is an early perimeter fence of rendered masonry with cast iron panels along the Church Street boundary, with the roots of mature banyans grown over the fence and nearby graves. The main entrance, off Church Street, appears to have been constructed at the same time as the fence.

West End Cemetery contains many substantial headstones of quality design and craftsmanship, which illustrate trends in Queensland monumental architectural from the 1860s to the early 20th century. The oldest headstone in the cemetery dates from 4 March 1868. Materials used include marble, sandstone, granite and a concrete and pebble mix. The first marble headstones were imported from Carrara in Italy. After the beginning of the Second World War in 1939, marble from Ulam near Rockhampton was used. Sandstone, which was not available locally, was brought from Helidon Quarry near Toowoomba, Coffs Harbour in New South Wales and from around Sydney. The only local material identified is granite from Magnetic Island and pink granite from Hervey Range and Castle Hill. More recent headstones and graves are made from cast concrete and are less ornate. Of the graves established between 1896 and 1919, 52 percent are surrounded by ironwork.

== Notable burials ==
Thomas Campbell's headstone, 2012

Many early inhabitants of Townsville and North Queensland are buried in West End Cemetery:

- Andrew Ball, founder of Townsville and a prominent businessman in the infant town, was buried in 1894
- George Burns, MLA
- Thomas Campbell, Member of the Queensland Legislative Assembly
- John Deane, Member of both the Queensland Legislative Assembly and Queensland Legislative Council
- William Hann, an early settler in the Kennedy District was buried in 1889
- Louis-André Navarre, Catholic missionary archbishop, later exhumed and reburied on Yule Island
- Charles Rowe, a partner with John Melton Black in the establishment of Black's pastoral empire in North Queensland was interred in 1900
- Captain Henry Daniel Sinclair, founder of Bowen
- Thankful Willmett, printer and businessman

A large mound in Block A is said to be a communal grave for child victims of an 1890s epidemic.

== Heritage listing ==
West End Cemetery was listed on the Queensland Heritage Register on 4 June 1996 having satisfied the following criteria.

The place is important in demonstrating the evolution or pattern of Queensland's history.

West End Cemetery is important because it provides evidence of the history and demography of Townsville and district. It also demonstrates architectural trends in monumental design during the latter half of the 19th and early 20th century.

West End Cemetery served as Townsville's General Cemetery from c. 1868 to 1902, and contains the graves of people important in the history of Townsville, the region and Queensland generally.

The place demonstrates rare, uncommon or endangered aspects of Queensland's cultural heritage.

In consequence, the cemetery provides a unique source of historical information about the development of Townsville and of North Queensland.

The place is important in demonstrating the principal characteristics of a particular class of cultural places.

The place remains a substantially intact example of a 19th Queensland cemetery, containing early headstones, plantings and perimeter fencing. In illustrating its type, the cemetery is an important source of information about the work of monumental masons and the history of cemetery design and aesthetics in Queensland.

The place is important because of its aesthetic significance.

The diverse collection of memorials, the location at the base of Castle Hill, the plantings and perimeter fencing, also exhibit significant and evocative aesthetic characteristics.

The place has a strong or special association with a particular community or cultural group for social, cultural or spiritual reasons.

The Townsville community values the cemetery because of its association with the city and region's early founders, and because many local people have family buried there.

The place has a special association with the life or work of a particular person, group or organisation of importance in Queensland's history.

West End Cemetery has special association with people of importance in Townsville, regional and Queensland history, including Andrew Ball, founder of Townsville, William Hann, early settler in the Kennedy Region, George Burns, an early Townsville MLA, Captain Sinclair, founder of Bowen, as well as a number of Townsville mayors and prominent citizens.
