= George Burns (Queensland politician) =

Australian politician

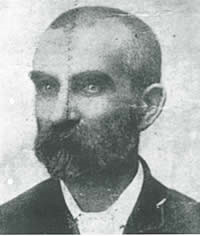

Member of the Queensland Legislative Assembly for Townsville
- In office 6 May 1893 – 5 Nov 1893 Serving with Robert Philp
- Preceded by: William Villiers Brown
- Succeeded by: Anthony Ogden

Personal details
- Born: George Robertson Burns; 1845 Edinburgh, Scotland
- Died: 5 November 1893 (aged 48) Keppel Bay, Queensland, Australia
- Resting place: West End Cemetery
- Party: Ministerial
- Spouse: Grace Clow (d.1926)
- Occupation: Engineer

George Robertson Burns (1847 – 5 November 1893) was a member of the Queensland Legislative Assembly.

== Biography ==
Burns was born in Edinburgh, Scotland, the son of Graham Burns and his wife Jessie (née McGregor) and was educated in Edinburgh public schools and the Ayr Academy. By 1862 he was apprenticed as an engineer in Glasgow before travelling to Peru and working as an engineer for Randolph, Elder & Company and McOnie's machinery. He then travelled to the United States of America before arriving in Queensland in 1875 and employed as an engineer at Hambledon's plantation in Cairns. He then leased the Townsville Foundry and in 1888 purchased the new Ross Creek Works of the Townsville Foundry and Shipping Company.

He was married to Grace Clow (died 1926) and together had four children. Burns died at Keppel Bay aboard the SS Airlie in November 1893 and was buried in Townsville's West End Cemetery.

== Public career ==
Burns won the junior position in the two-member seat of Townsville for the Ministerialists at the 1893 Queensland colonial election. He was on his way home to Townsville from Brisbane when he died six months later.

Parliament of Queensland
Preceded by William Villiers Brown	Member for Townsville; 1893; Served alongside: Robert Philp	Succeeded by Anthony Ogden
