= Robert Philp =

Australian politician (1851–1922)

The Honourable Sir Robert Philp KCMG
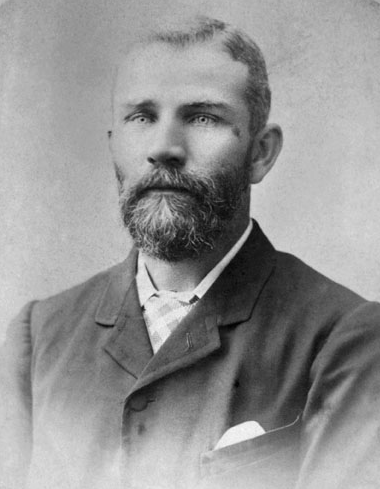

15th Premier of Queensland
- In office 7 December 1899 – 17 September 1903
- Preceded by: Anderson Dawson
- Succeeded by: Arthur Morgan
- Constituency: Townsville
- In office 19 November 1907 – 18 February 1908
- Preceded by: William Kidston
- Succeeded by: William Kidston
- Constituency: Townsville

18th Treasurer of Queensland
- In office 2 March 1898 – 1 December 1899
- Preceded by: Hugh Nelson
- Succeeded by: William Kidston
- Constituency: Townsville
- In office 7 December 1899 – 1 February 1901
- Preceded by: William Kidston
- Succeeded by: Thomas Bridson Cribb
- Constituency: Townsville
- In office 19 November 1907 – 18 February 1908
- Preceded by: William Kidston
- Succeeded by: Peter Airey
- Constituency: Townsville

Leader of the Opposition of Queensland
- In office 1 December 1899 – 7 December 1899
- Preceded by: Anderson Dawson
- Succeeded by: Anderson Dawson
- In office 17 September 1903 – 28 June 1904
- Preceded by: Billy Browne
- Succeeded by: Arthur Rutledge
- In office 19 September 1904 – 19 November 1907
- Preceded by: Arthur Rutledge
- Succeeded by: William Kidston
- In office 15 February 1908 – 29 October 1908
- Preceded by: William Kidston
- Succeeded by: David Bowman

Member of the Queensland Legislative Assembly for Musgrave
- In office 5 January 1886 – 9 May 1888
- Preceded by: New seat
- Succeeded by: William O'Connell

Member of the Queensland Legislative Assembly for Townsville
- In office 12 May 1888 – 22 May 1915 Serving with William Brown, George Burns, Anthony Ogden, William Castling, Patrick Hanran, Thomas Foley
- Preceded by: William Villiers Brown
- Succeeded by: Daniel Ryan

Personal details
- Born: 28 December 1851 Glasgow, Scotland, UK
- Died: 17 July 1922 (aged 70) Brisbane, Queensland, Australia
- Resting place: Toowong Cemetery
- Party: Ministerialist

Sir Robert Philp, KCMG (28 December 1851 – 17 June 1922) was a Queensland businessman and politician who was Premier of Queensland from December 1899 to September 1903 and again from November 1907 to February 1908.

== Early life ==
Philp was born in Glasgow, Scotland, the second son of John Philp, a lime-kiln operator, and Mary Ann Philp (née Wylie). He emigrated to Brisbane with his parents and siblings in 1862, where his father took a lease on the municipal baths, and later became involved in the cattle and sugar industries. Philp was educated at the National (Normal) School until 1863 when he started work at Bright Bros & Co shipping company, before moving to Townsville in 1874 to take up the position of junior partner in the trading company Burns, Philp and Company.

Burns, Philp & Co acted as agents and provisioners for the sugar cane and pastoral industries that sustained Northern Queensland, and Philp served as manager of the Townsville office. Beginning in 1881, Philp diverted some of the company's vessels to the labour trade, recruiting South Pacific Islanders (known as Kanakas) to work as indentured labourers on the canefields, despite the reservations of his business partner James Burns. A royal commission into recruiting practices in 1885 coincided with a downturn in the sugar industry, and as a result the company's vessels were returned to other commercial operations. While this affair had been profitable for Burns, Philp, it did not contribute significantly to later commercial success, although it would not be Philp's last interest in the South Pacific labour trade.

Despite the success of Burns, Philp & Co, Philp made some poor personal investments, such as his loss of £5000 on the "Comet" mine. Like many others he was affected by the economic depression of the 1890s, borrowing £20,000 to purchase property in Brisbane which three years later was valued at only £16,230. He also owed considerable sums of money to the North Queensland Mortgage & Investment Co., as well as holding a £5000 mortgage with respect to other properties. Although Burns tried to assist him, Philp was forced to sell his shares in Burns, Philp & Co in 1893, and was still in financial difficulty as late as 1898, although by this stage he had restricted his business ventures to more conservative investments.

When the business-friendly McIlwraith government lost office in 1883 it was succeeded by the Liberal government of Samuel Griffith that sought to end the trade in Kanakas. As a prominent businessman who had served several times on the local council Philp was active in bankrolling and supporting candidates in opposition to Griffith. He supported the growing movement for the separation of North Queensland from the rest of the colony.

== Early parliamentary career ==
Philp entered the Legislative Assembly of Queensland in 1886 as Member for Musgrave. He supported the North Queensland separatists in their unsuccessful attempts to gain independence, but spent most of his early parliamentary career preoccupied with his business affairs. His seat of Musgrave was abolished and in 1888 he was successfully returned as one of the two members for the electorate of Townsville. His parliamentary activity was mainly in support of North Queensland and his business interests – extending railway links to North Queensland, and the abolition of import tariffs. When the import of Pacific islanders was temporarily halted in 1892 Philp was instrumental in securing its resumption.

== Premier and opposition leader ==
Philp was a prolific speculator and in 1893 he was forced by debt to resign from the board of directors of Burns, Philp. In May of the same year McIlwraith, now governing in coalition with Griffith in what was known as the "Continuous Ministry", appointed Philp as Minister for Mines. He held several other ministerial posts, such as Public Instruction, Railways, Public Works and Treasurer until 1899. when the Continuous Ministry was briefly unseated by the Labor government of Anderson Dawson. Philp was an able administrator. He codified mining regulations and encouraged the private development of railways throughout the colony. The railway construction process was alleged to be corrupt by the Labor members, and after narrowly winning a vote of confidence in November 1899 James Dickson resigned as Premier. Dawson's government lasted a week before losing Parliamentary support and Philp, despite his protestations in support of Dickson, was chosen as Premier by his colleagues.

The Australian colonies federated in 1901 and the new prime minister Edmund Barton immediately ended the trade in Kanakas via the Pacific Island Labourers Act 1901. By this stage Queensland was severely depleted in revenue, and Federation exacerbated this situation by depriving Queensland of excise and customs funds. By 1902, Philp had come to believe that "the Queensland sugar industry faced ruin because of Barton's actions" and became a leading critic of Barton and the federal government. Later that year he gave tacit support to a secessionist motion moved by Thomas Plunkett, before reversing his position and attempting to water down the motion to a more general condemnation of the federal government. His actions were said to have "serious damage to his political reputation", as his support base in North Queensland had larged voted in favour of federation.

Despite a severe drought and the dire state of the state's finances, Philp's government was re-elected at the 1902 state election. Discontent brewed among Ministerialists who were bitter at missing out on Cabinet positions, and in August 1903 Digby Denham crossed the floor with supporters to bring down the government and form a coalition led by Arthur Morgan.

Philp, with his genial nature, was ill-suited to the position of Opposition Leader, and showed little enthusiasm in attacking the new government. Morgan briefly lost control of the Legislative Assembly in 1904 and Philp was called upon by Governor Sir Herbert Chermside to form a ministry, but could not secure sufficient support from among his colleagues. The end result was a dissolution of Parliament and a solid defeat of the Opposition. Philp resumed his position as Leader and his conciliatory treatment of the government continued when fellow Scot William Kidston became Premier. Philp cultivated good relations with Kidston and helped foster the increasing gap between Kidston and the Labor movement.

Philp's party was again unsuccessful in the elections of 1907. Kidston was encountering difficulties in securing the passage of his legislation through the intransigent Legislative Council and after Lord Chelmsford as Governor refused Kidston's request to appoint sufficient new councillors so as to give Kidston a majority, he resigned in November. Lord Chelmsford commissioned Philp as Premier, but, unable to entice any of Kidston's supporters to his cause, he remained without a majority in the Legislative Assembly, which promptly blocked supply. Over Kidston's protests, Lord Chelmsford guaranteed supply through the issuing of writs and then dissolved the Assembly, but Philp failed to win the subsequent election.

In 1908 Kidston, alienated from the Labor party, relied on Philp's support to pass legislation approving construction of private railways. By October the two leaders had sufficient in common that they negotiated a merger of their two parties, ending Philp's career as opposition leader.

== Later life ==
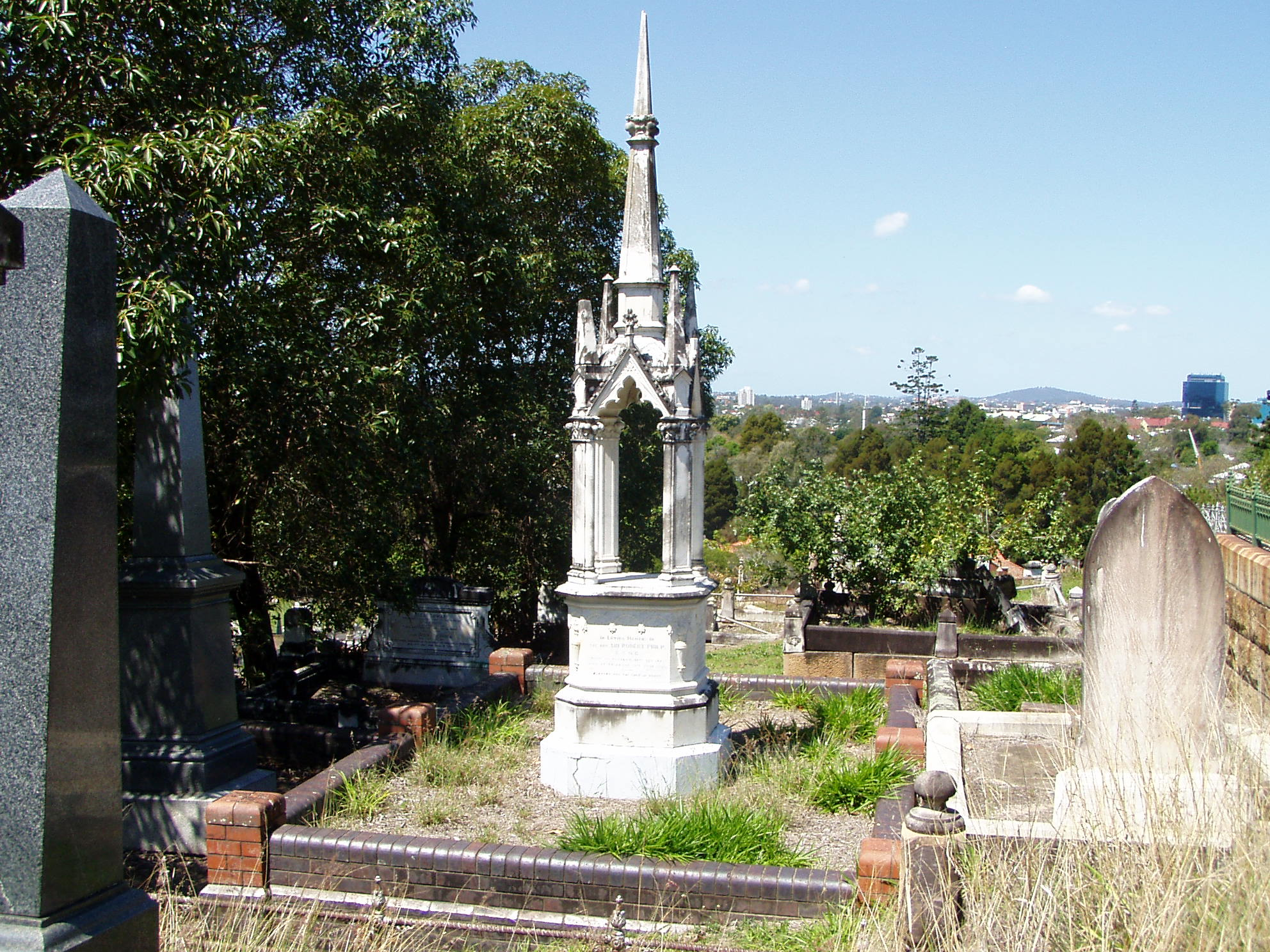
The grave of Sir Robert Philp at Brisbane's Toowong Cemetery.

Philp remained in parliament, and also returned to tending his business interests. He enjoyed the status that his long parliamentary career gave him and participated in the foundation of the University of Queensland in 1912. He was a member of the University's first Senate, and its representative at a conference of universities in Glasgow in 1912. Philp lost his seat by a small margin in the Labor landslide of 1915 but remained active in politics, campaigning for the conscription referendums of the First World War and leading the resistance to the abolition of the Legislative Council. In 1920 he led a delegation to London which thwarted Premier Ted Theodore's attempts to gain loans from London financiers to fund government expenditure.

On 17 June 1922 he died in Brisbane and was buried at Toowong Cemetery.

== Family ==
Philp married Jessie Banister Campbell (daughter of prominent Brisbane businessman James Campbell) in 1878; she died in 1890. In 1898 he married Wilhelmina Fraser Munro; she died in 1940

Political offices
Preceded by Anderson Dawson	Premier of Queensland; 1899–1903	Succeeded by Arthur Morgan
Preceded by William Kidston	Premier of Queensland; 1907–1908	Succeeded by William Kidston
Preceded by Anderson Dawson	Leader of the Opposition in Queensland; 1899	Succeeded by Anderson Dawson
Preceded by William Browne	Leader of the Opposition in Queensland; 1903–1904	Succeeded by Arthur Rutledge
Preceded by Arthur Rutledge	Leader of the Opposition in Queensland; 1904–1907	Succeeded by William Kidston
Preceded by William Kidston	Leader of the Opposition in Queensland; 1908	Succeeded by David Bowman
Parliament of Queensland
New seat	Member for Musgrave; 1886–1888	Succeeded by William O'Connell
Preceded by William Villiers Brown	Member for Townsville; 1888–1915; Served alongside: William Brown, George Burns, Anthony Ogden, William Castling, Patrick Hanran, Thomas Foley	Succeeded by Daniel Ryan
