= William Villiers Brown =

Australian politician

The Hon William Brown
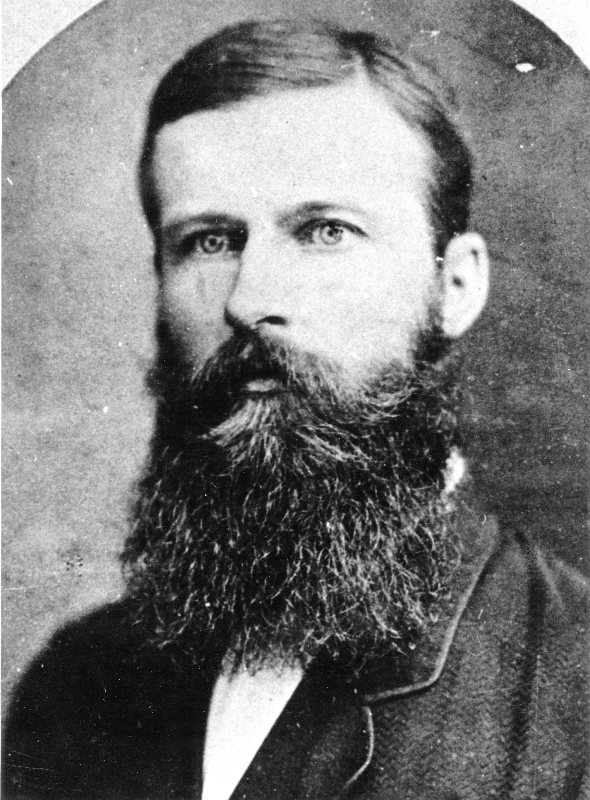

Member of the Queensland Legislative Assembly for Townsville
- In office 11 November 1885 – 12 May 1888 Serving with John Macrossan
- Preceded by: New seat
- Succeeded by: Robert Philp
- In office 2 May 1891 – 6 May 1893 Serving with Robert Philp
- Preceded by: John Macrossan
- Succeeded by: George Burns

Member of the Queensland Legislative Council
- In office 15 July 1901 – 29 April 1915

Personal details
- Born: William Villiers Brown c. 1843 Melbourne, Colony of New South Wales
- Died: 1915 (aged 71–72) Toowoomba, Queensland, Australia
- Resting place: Toowong Cemetery
- Spouse: Emily Warner (m.1868 d.1929)
- Occupation: Company director

William Villiers Brown (c. 1843 – 29 April 1915) was an Australian politician. He was a member of the Queensland Legislative Assembly and the Queensland Legislative Council.

== Public life ==
Brown was the member for Townsville in the Legislative Assembly of Queensland from 1885 to 1888 and from 1891 to 1893.

He was appointed a member of the Queensland Legislative Council from 1901 to his death in 1915. He served as a minister without portfolio in Robert Philp's government from 1907 to 1908.

== Later life ==
Brown died on 29 April 1915 and was buried in Toowong Cemetery.

Parliament of Queensland
New seat	Member for Townsville; 1885–1888; Served alongside: John Macrossan	Succeeded by Robert Philp
Preceded by John Macrossan	Member for Townsville; 1891–1893; Served alongside: Robert Philp	Succeeded by George Burns
