= Old St Patrick's Church, Brandon =

Church building in Queensland, Australia

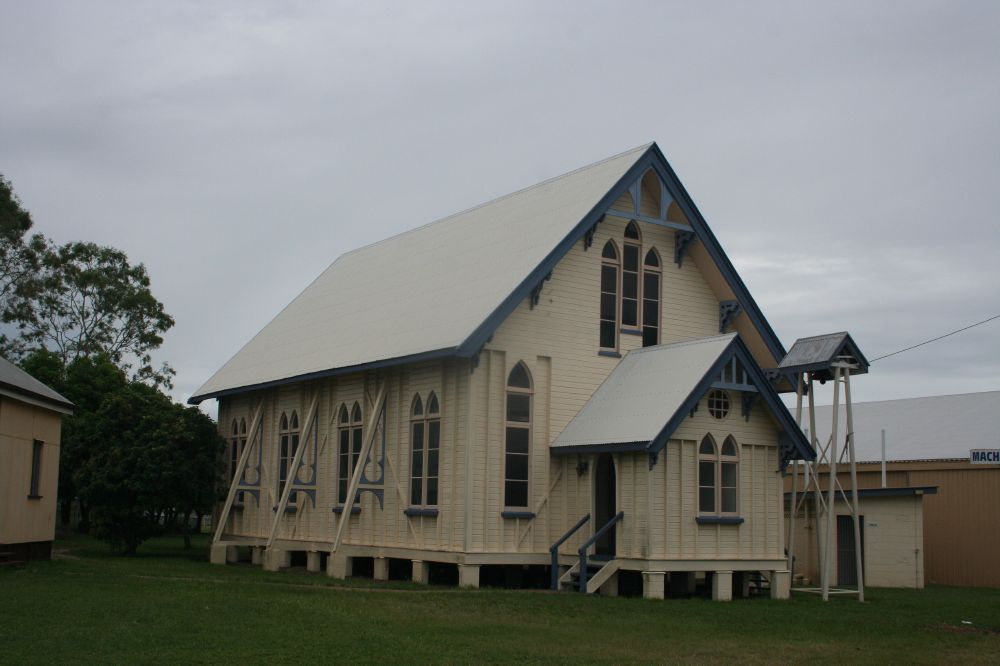
- St Patrick's Catholic Church, Brandon, 2011

- Location within Queensland Location within Australia
- 19.5551°S 147.3531°E
- Location: 27 Spiller Street, Brandon, Shire of Burdekin, Queensland, Australia

History
- Design period: 1900–1914 (early 20th century)
- Built: 1910

Site notes
- Architectural style: Carpenter Gothic

Queensland Heritage Register
- Official name: St Patrick's Catholic Church (former), Burdekin Academy of Dance
- Type: state heritage (built)
- Designated: 21 October 1992
- Reference no.: 600372
- Significant period: 1910 (fabric); 1910–1974, 1989, 1991 (historical)

St Patrick's Catholic Church is a heritage-listed former Roman Catholic church at 27 Spiller Street, Brandon, Shire of Burdekin, Queensland, Australia. It was built in 1910. It is also known as Burdekin Academy of Dance. It was added to the Queensland Heritage Register on 21 October 1992.

== History ==
The former St Patrick's Catholic Church, Brandon, is a timber church originally constructed in 1910 when Brandon was part of the Roman Catholic Diocese of Rockhampton. It ceased to be used by the Church in 1974 and following severe cyclone damage in 1989 was moved to its present site by the Burdekin Shire Council.

Despite the domination of plantation style sugar production, small selectors were also cultivating small plantings of cane throughout Queensland by the late 1860s. The advent of selectors seeking agricultural land was encouraged by the government with the introduction of the Alienation of Crown Lands Act of 1868. This act allowed people of limited means to acquire land for agricultural purposes. While land north of the Burdekin River was opened for closer settlement by 1868, the first land sales in the district did not take place until late 1878. William Bannister, who selected 632 acres (256 ha) on the east side of Station Creek on 1 November 1878, subdivided part of his land soon after selection to form a township which he named Brandon. This township was a private town located close to the Pioneer Plantation.

The population of the district grew rapidly after the land was opened for closer selection as did the demand for community services, social activity and spiritual support. The needs of Catholics in the district were met by visiting priests from Townsville who held services at Lewis Hoey's Pioneer Mill, Lynche's Hotel in Ayr, Sergt. McBride's police residence in Ayr, in the state school at Brandon, and at Burkes Hotel, Brandon.

In 1893, the Burdekin District was attached to the Diocese of Rockhampton and in 1896 a meeting was held to decide where the first catholic church would be built in the Burdekin District. The decision was made to locate the church in Brandon and the building was opened in 1897 on a site close to where the first state school was constructed. This church was damaged in Cyclone Leonta in 1903 and was rebuilt from the damaged material.

Around 1907, Ingham parish priests were given responsibility for the Burdekin district and in 1908 it passed to the care of Townsville Parish. Plans were made in 1910 for the establishment of a parish encompassing both Brandon and Ayr. This parish was established on St Patrick's Day, 17 March 1912, with Fr Jules Bucas as the first parish priest. Fr Bucas first resided in the sacristy of the new Brandon church. The old church was modified and moved to the convent site for use as a school. It was again moved in 1936 to become St Francis Catholic Church, Jarvisfield. The new parish remained part of the Diocese of Rockhampton until 1930 when the Diocese of Townsville was established. On 23 July 1944, a fire damaged a portion of St Patrick's sacristy which was repaired.

The church continued in use by the Roman Catholic community until 1974 when a new church was opened on an adjoining site on 21 April by Bishop Leonard Faulkner, Bishop of the Diocese of Townsville. The old church was listed by the National Trust of Queensland and by the Australian Heritage Commission in 1975. It was sold by the Diocese in 1979 to Filippo Patane who leased it to the Burdekin Academy of Dance.

In 1989, the building lost much of its roof cladding and was moved from its foundations during Cyclone Aivu. Fearing its collapse, the owner sold it for removal. The Burdekin Shire Council objected to the removal of the heritage-listed building and prevented its loss from the town by purchasing it in late April 1989. In January 1991, the building was relocated to a site beside the Renown Theatre on Spillar St, Brandon. as the nucleus of a "Heritage Estate" for the district. The Shire Council repaired the building for use as a community meeting place and weddings.

In April 2015, the shire council repurposed the building as the Artspace where the Burdekin Artisans can display and sell local art and craftwork.

== Description ==
The former St Patrick's Church, Brandon, is a single-storey timber building located on the outskirts of the town of Brandon. It addresses Spillar Street to the east, and sits on a triangular block formed by the North Coast railway line and the Bruce Highway. Adjacent is the former Renown Theatre and opposite a small park which includes the Brandon War Memorial.

The former church is set on low stumps and is rectangular in form with a steeply pitched gable roof clad in corrugated iron. The front of the church is symmetrical with a central entry porch flanked by single lancet windows. The projecting gables have fretted brackets to the eaves.

The external walls have exposed stud framing lined with chamferboards, with external sheeting flashing over the windows. The side walls of the former nave are supported by timber buttresses. The tall casement windows, doors and archways have pointed, arched heads. Other Gothic elements include ornament over the gable ties and infill to the wall buttresses.

Entry is through the porch at the eastern end. The body of the building is an open hall with a polished timber floor. Above the entrance door is a loft reached by a narrow timber stair. The roof framing is supported on hammerbeam brackets with tie rods. The raked ceiling is lined with diagonal boarding. At the western end is a small room leading to the rear doors. No internal fittings survive.

== Heritage listing ==
The former St Patrick's Catholic Church was listed on the Queensland Heritage Register on 21 October 1992 having satisfied the following criteria.

The place is important in demonstrating the evolution or pattern of Queensland's history.

St Patrick's Church demonstrates the early development of the Burdekin District and the growth of the Catholic Church in North Queensland.

The place is important in demonstrating the principal characteristics of a particular class of cultural places.

It is considered an excellent example of a "carpenter Gothic" church and was used as an exemplar of this style in the reference work Identifying Australian Architecture: Styles and Terms for 1788 to the Present by Apperley, Irving & Reynolds (1989).

The place is important because of its aesthetic significance.

It is a well composed design and has considerable visual appeal, being listed on the Registers of both the National Estate and the National Trust of Queensland for its architectural merit.

The place has a strong or special association with a particular community or cultural group for social, cultural or spiritual reasons.

It has strong associations with the Catholic community of the area and of the Shire of Burdekin in which it is thought to be the oldest building extant and whose Council purchased it to preserve it for this community.
