= Jerona, Queensland =

Jerona
- Town
- Interactive map of Jerona
- Coordinates: 19.4465°S 147.2380°E
- Country: Australia
- State: Queensland
- LGA: Shire of Burdekin
- Location: 42.3 km (26.3 mi) NW of Ayr; 79.3 km (49.3 mi) SE of Townsville; 1,306 km (812 mi) NNW of Brisbane

Government
  - State electorate: Burdekin
  - Federal division: Dawson

Area
  - Total: 115.7 km^{2} (44.7 sq mi)

Population
  - Total: 41 (2021 census)
  - Density: 0.354/km^{2} (0.918/sq mi)
- Time zone: UTC+10:00 (AEST)
- Postcode: 4809
Localities around Jerona
Coral Sea	Coral Sea	Coral Sea
Giru	Jerona	Colevale
Horseshoe Lagoon	Barratta	Barratta

Jerona is a rural town and coastal locality in the Shire of Burdekin, Queensland, Australia. In the 2021 census, the locality of Jerona had a population of 41 people.

== Geography ==
The town of Jerona is on the western side of the estuary of Barratta Creek on the northern coast of the locality. Most of the locality is within the Bowling Green Bay National Park, except for the town and a small area on the eastern boundary of the locality.

The only road into the town is Jerona Road which enters the locality from Barratta to the south, where it connects to the Bruce Highway.

Apart from the national park, the predominant land use is suburban residential housing within the town.

== History ==
The area was originally a cattle grazing property known as Jerona and Soulbourne holdings held by Lorenzo Fabrellas. In 1942, the Queensland Government offered it as two parcels of leasehold land, consisting of 40 square miles (100 km^{2}) and 27 square miles (70 km^{2}).

The locality was officially named on 1 November 1980, presumably after the name of the earlier grazing property.

== Demographics ==
In the 2016 census, the locality of Jerona had a population of 40 people.

In the 2021 census, the locality of Jerona had a population of 41 people.

== Education ==
There are no schools in Jerona. The nearest government primary schools are Giru State School in neighbouring Giru to the west and Brandon State School in Brandon to the south-east. The nearest government secondary school is Ayr State High School in Ayr to the south-east. There are also a number of non-government schools in Ayr.
