= Airville, Queensland =

Airville
- Suburb
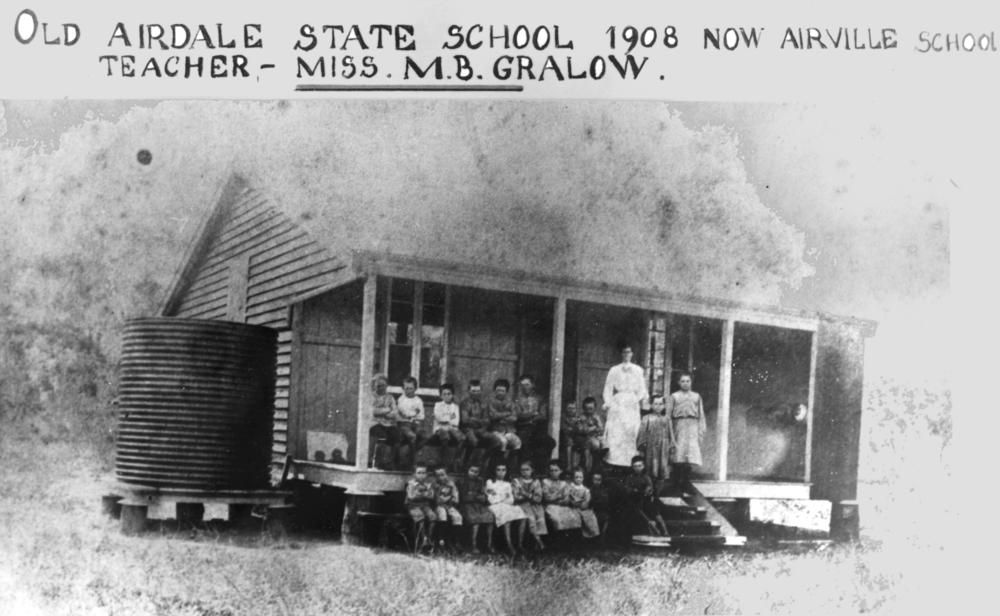
- Teacher Miss M.B. Gralow and students, Airdale School, 1908

- Interactive map of Airville
- Coordinates: 19.6322°S 147.3452°E
- Country: Australia
- State: Queensland
- LGA: Shire of Burdekin
- Location: 11.8 km (7.3 mi) SW of Ayr; 90.1 km (56.0 mi) SE of Townsville; 1,247 km (775 mi) NNW of Brisbane

Government
  - State electorate: Burdekin
  - Federal division: Dawson

Area
  - Total: 43.9 km^{2} (16.9 sq mi)

Population
  - Total: 308 (2021 census)
  - Density: 7.016/km^{2} (18.17/sq mi)
- Time zone: UTC+10:00 (AEST)
- Postcode: 4807
Suburbs around Airville
| Barratta | Brandon | Brandon |
| Mount Kelly | Airville | McDesme |
| Mount Kelly | Osborne | Home Hill |

Airville is a rural locality in the Shire of Burdekin, Queensland, Australia. In the 2021 census, Airville had a population of 308 people.

== Geography ==
Airville is bounded on the south-east by the Burdekin River. It is flat low-lying land (about 10 metres above sea level) used predominantly for sugarcane plantations. There is a network of cane tramways to deliver the harvested sugar to the local sugar mills.

Maida Vale is a neighbourhood in the north-east of the locality (19.6°S 147.35°E).

Labatt Lagoon is a waterhole (19.6166°S 147.3166°E).

== History ==
Airdale Provisional School opened in the south-west of the locality on 2 September 1890, becoming Airdale State School on 1 January 1909. In 1926, it was renamed Airville State School.

Maidavale State School opened in the north-east of the locality on 27 April 1910.

== Demographics ==
In the 2016 census, Airville had a population of 338 people.

In the 2021 census, Airville had a population of 308 people.

== Education ==
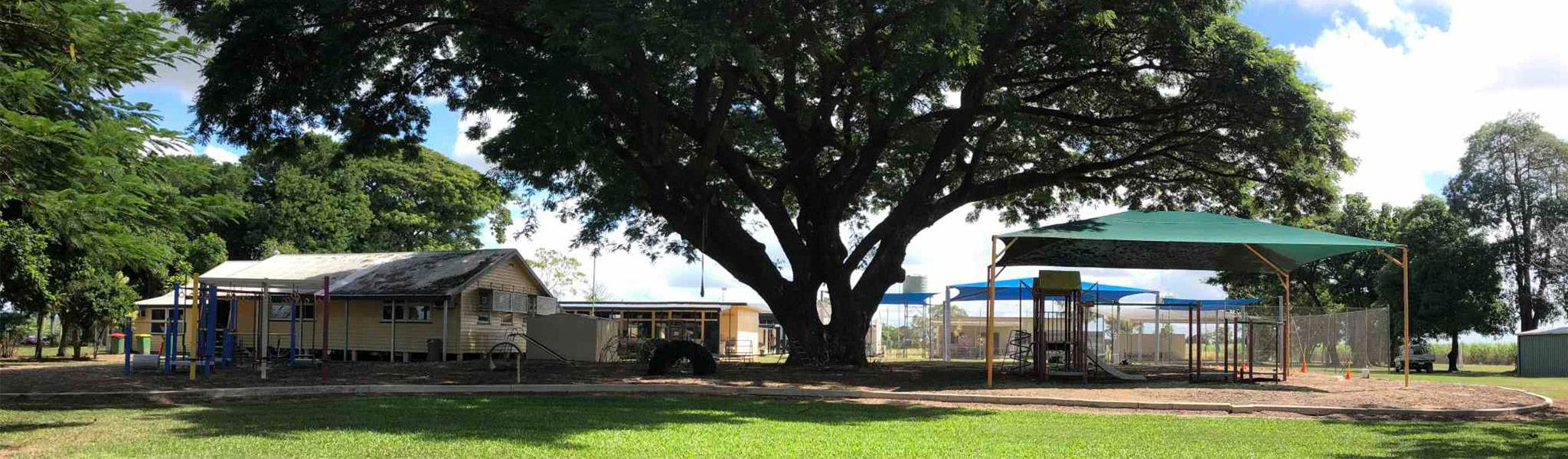
Airville State School, 2025

Airville State School is a government primary (Prep-6) school for boys and girls at Old Clare Road (19.6551°S 147.3476°E). In 2016, the school had an enrolment of 23 students who come from the local rural community with 3 teachers (2 full-time equivalent) and 5 non-teaching staff (3 full-time equivalent). In 2018, the school had an enrolment of 9 students with 2 teachers (1 full-time equivalent) and 4 non-teaching staff (3 full-time equivalent).

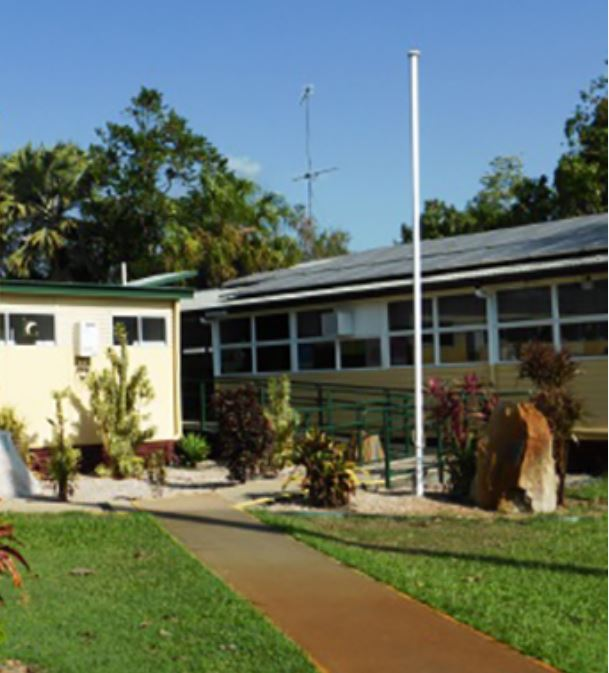
Maidavale State School, 2025

Maidavale State School is a government primary (Prep-6) school for boys and girls at Maidavale Road (19.6025°S 147.3599°E). In 2016, the school had an enrolment of 10 students with 2 teachers (1 full-time equivalent) and 5 non-teaching staff (2 full-time equivalent). In 2018, the school had an enrolment of 6 students with 2 teachers (1 full-time equivalent) and 4 non-teaching staff (2 full-time equivalent).

There is no secondary school in Airville. The nearest government secondary schools are Ayr State High School in Ayr to the north-east and Home Hill State High School in neighbouring Home Hill to the south-east.
