= Airdmillan, Queensland =

Airdmillan
- Suburb
- Interactive map of Airdmillan
- Coordinates: 19.5230°S 147.4752°E
- Country: Australia
- State: Queensland
- LGA: Shire of Burdekin
- Location: 7.4 km (4.6 mi) NE of Ayr; 95.8 km (59.5 mi) SE of Townsville; 1,281 km (796 mi) NNW of Brisbane

Government
  - State electorate: Burdekin
  - Federal division: Dawson

Area
  - Total: 59.0 km^{2} (22.8 sq mi)

Population
  - Total: 154 (2021 census)
  - Density: 2.610/km^{2} (6.760/sq mi)
- Time zone: UTC+10:00 (AEST)
- Postcode: 4807
Suburbs around Airdmillan
Alva	Alva	Coral Sea
Ayr	Airdmillan	Coral Sea
Ayr	Jarvisfield	Jarvisfield

Airdmillan is a coastal locality in the Shire of Burdekin, Queensland, Australia. In the 2021 census, Airdmillan had a population of 154 people.

== Geography ==
The Coral Sea forms the eastern boundary, while Plantation Creek forms part of the southern. Kalamia Creek forms the northern boundary, and Mud Creek drains the land between.

== History ==
The name Airdmillan comes from the name of a local sugar plantation. It is a coined word, combining the Gaelic word aird meaning high / lofty and Millan from the name of the plantation owner, Archibald Campbell MacMillan.

The Airdmillan State School opened on 30 January 1912; it closed on 12 December 1986.

== Demographics ==
In the 2016 census, Airdmillan had a population of 109 people.

In the 2021 census, Airdmillan had a population of 154 people.

== Education ==
There are no schools in Airdmillan. The nearest government primary schools are Kalamia State School in Brandon to the west and East Ayr State School in neighbouring Ayr to the south-west. The nearest government secondary school is Ayr State High School, also in Ayr. There are also non-government primary and secondary schools in Ayr.
