= Barratta, Queensland =

Barratta
- Town
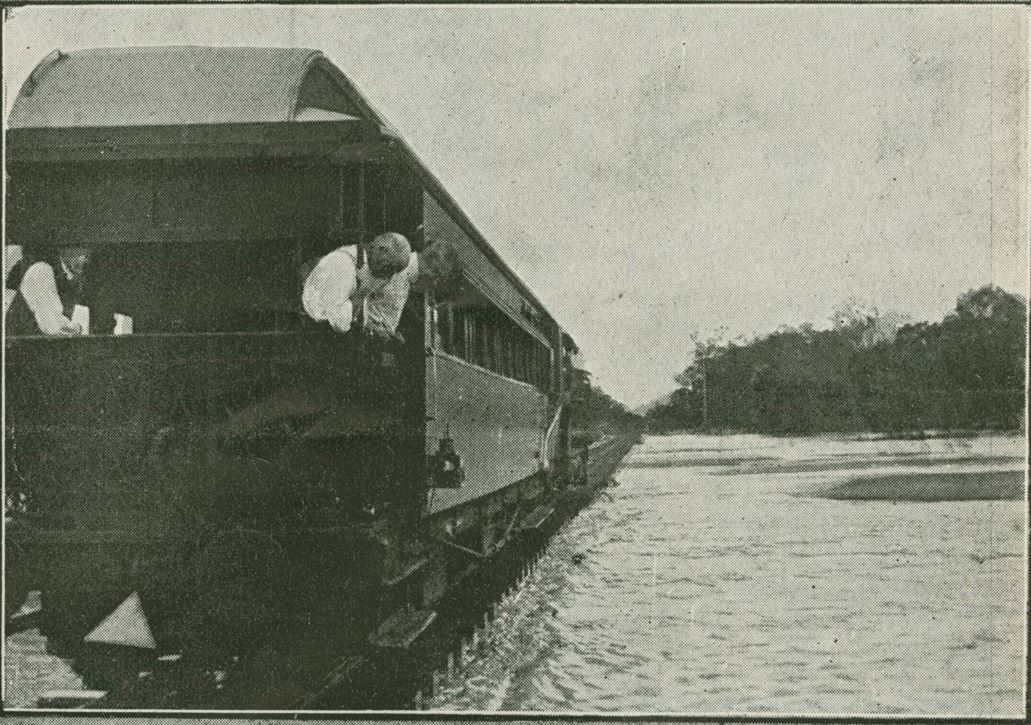
- Train crossing Barratta Creek during a flood with the water up to the decking of the bridge, 1918

- Interactive map of Barratta
- Coordinates: 19.5069°S 147.2547°E
- Country: Australia
- State: Queensland
- LGA: Shire of Burdekin
- Location: 15.8 km (9.8 mi) W of Ayr; 79.5 km (49.4 mi) SE of Townsville; 1,283 km (797 mi) NNW of Brisbane

Government
  - State electorate: Burdekin
  - Federal division: Dawson

Area
  - Total: 236.9 km^{2} (91.5 sq mi)

Population
  - Total: 85 (2021 census locality)
  - Density: 0.3588/km^{2} (0.929/sq mi)
- Time zone: UTC+10:00 (AEST)
- Postcode: 4809
Localities around Barratta
Jerona	Jerona	Colevale
Horseshoe Lagoon	Barratta	Brandon
Upper Haughton	Mona Park	Airville; Mount Kelly

Barratta is a rural town and a locality in the Shire of Burdekin, Queensland, Australia. In the 2021 census, the locality of Barratta had a population of 85 people.

== Geography ==
Barratta Creek rises in the locality and runs north through Jerona to the Coral Sea, while Barramundi Creek also rises and runs to the north-west.

The Bruce Highway enters the locality from the east (Brandon) and exits to the west (Horseshoe Lagoon).

The North Coast railway line enters the locality from the east (Brandon) and exits to the west (Horseshoe Lagoon), but runs approx 5 kilometres (3.1 mi) north and parallel to the highway. The locality is served by Barratta railway station is a railway station (19.5273°S 147.2110°E) and was formerly served by the now-abandoned Lochinvar railway station (19.5227°S 147.2716°E).

The land use is divided between grazing on native vegetation in the north of the locality and growing sugarcane in the south of the locality. Cane tramways pass through the south of the locality to transport the harvested sugarcane to the Pioneer sugar mill.

== History ==
In 1881, the success of sugarcane growing in the Burdekin district and the navigability of Barratta Creek from the Coral Sea via Bowling Green Bay resulted in a proposal to establish a town and a port along Barratta Creek. In 1885, the Queensland Government had surveyed a town site called Noondoo and offered over 100 town lots for sale. On 25 September 1897, the town's name was changed to Baratta by notification in the Queensland Government Gazette and then to Barratta (two "r"s) on 21 March 1902. Barratta is believed to be an Aboriginal name for the chain of lagoons in the area. However, no port was established and the town did not develop. The town remains officially in existence, but, as at 2024, is being used as grazing land.

In February 1918, extensive flooding in the region affected Barratta Creek with over 2 feet (0.61 m) of water flowing over the railway bridge crossing the creek.

== Demographics ==
In the 2016 census, the locality of Barratta had a population of 69 people.

In the 2021 census, the locality of Barratta had a population of 85 people.

== Education ==
There are no schools in Barratta. The nearest government primary schools are:

- Brandon State School in neighbouring Brandon to the east
- Maidavale State School in neighbouring Airville to the south-east
- Airville State School in neighbouring Airville to the south-east
- Clare State School in Clare to the south
- Giru State School in Giru to the west

The nearest government secondary school is Ayr State High School in Ayr to the east.
