= Horseshoe Lagoon, Queensland =

Horseshoe Lagoon
- Suburb
- Interactive map of Horseshoe Lagoon
- Coordinates: 19.5661°S 147.1416°E
- Country: Australia
- State: Queensland
- LGA: Shire of Burdekin
- Location: 11.9 km (7.4 mi) SSE of Giru; 32.6 km (20.3 mi) W of Ayr; 59.6 km (37.0 mi) SE of Townsville CBD; 1,307 km (812 mi) NNW of Brisbane

Government
  - State electorate: Burdekin
  - Federal division: Dawson

Area
  - Total: 84.0 km^{2} (32.4 sq mi)

Population
  - Total: 213 (2021 census)
  - Density: 2.536/km^{2} (6.567/sq mi)
- Time zone: UTC+10:00 (AEST)
- Postcode: 4809
Suburbs around Horseshoe Lagoon
Giru	Giru	Jerona
Shirbourne	Horseshoe Lagoon	Barratta
Majors Creek	Upper Haughton	Barratta

Horseshoe Lagoon is a rural locality in the Shire of Burdekin, Queensland, Australia. In the 2021 census, Horseshoe Lagoon had a population of 213 people.

== Geography ==
The Haughton River forms part of the western boundary. Horseshoe Lagoon (the body of water) is in the west of the locality adjacent to the river.

The Bruce Highway enters the locality from the east (Barratta) and exits to the west (Mount Surround / Giru).

The North Coast railway line enters the locality from the north-east (Barratta) and exists to the north-west (Giru); there are no stations within the locality.

The predominant land use is growing sugarcane. There is a network of cane tramways to transport the harvested sugarcane to the Invicta sugar mill in neighbouring Giru.

== History ==
The locality was named and bounded on 23 February 2001. It is presumably named after the small lagoon in the west of the locality, which is locally known as Horseshoe Lagoon (now protected within the Horseshoe Lagoon Conservation Park).

== Demographics ==
In the 2016 census, Horseshoe Lagoon had a population of 217 people.

In the 2021 census, Horseshoe Lagoon had a population of 213 people.

== Education ==
There are no schools in Horseshoe Lagoon. The nearest government primary school is Giru State School in neighbouring Giru to the north-west. The nearest government secondary school is Ayr State High School in Ayr to the east.
