= Colevale, Queensland =

Colevale
- Suburb
- Interactive map of Colevale
- Coordinates: 19.4561°S 147.3383°E
- Country: Australia
- State: Queensland
- LGA: Shire of Burdekin
- Location: 9.0 km (5.6 mi) N of Brandon; 13.5 km (8.4 mi) NW of Ayr; 91.7 km (57.0 mi) SW of Townsville; 1,287 km (800 mi) NNW of Brisbane

Government
  - State electorate: Burdekin
  - Federal division: Dawson

Area
  - Total: 97.6 km^{2} (37.7 sq mi)

Population
  - Total: 19 (2021 census)
  - Density: 0.195/km^{2} (0.504/sq mi)
- Time zone: UTC+10:00 (AEST)
- Postcode: 4808
Suburbs around Colevale
Coral Sea	Coral Sea	Coral Sea
Jerona	Colevale	Alva
Barratta	Brandon	Alva

Colevale is a coastal rural locality in the Shire of Burdekin, Queensland, Australia. In the 2021 census, Colevale had a population of 19 people.

== Geography ==
The northern coastal part of the locality is bounded by the Coral Sea and is within the Bowling Green Bay National Park.

Much of the land is low-lying with high water levels. The southern part of the locality is predominantly used for growing sugarcane, while the other land (apart from the national park) is predominantly used for grazing on native vegetation.

There are two cane tramways to transport the harvested sugarcane to the Pioneer sugar mill.

== History ==
The locality was officially named and bounded on 23 February 2001.

== Demographics ==
In the 2016 census, Colevale had a population of 17 people.

In the 2021 census, Colevale had a population of 19 people.

== Education ==
There are no schools in Colevale. The nearest government primary school is Brandon State School in neighbouring Brandon to the south. The nearest government secondary school is Ayr State High School in Ayr to the south-east. There are also a number of non-government and special-purpose schools in Ayr.
