= Cyclone Leonta =

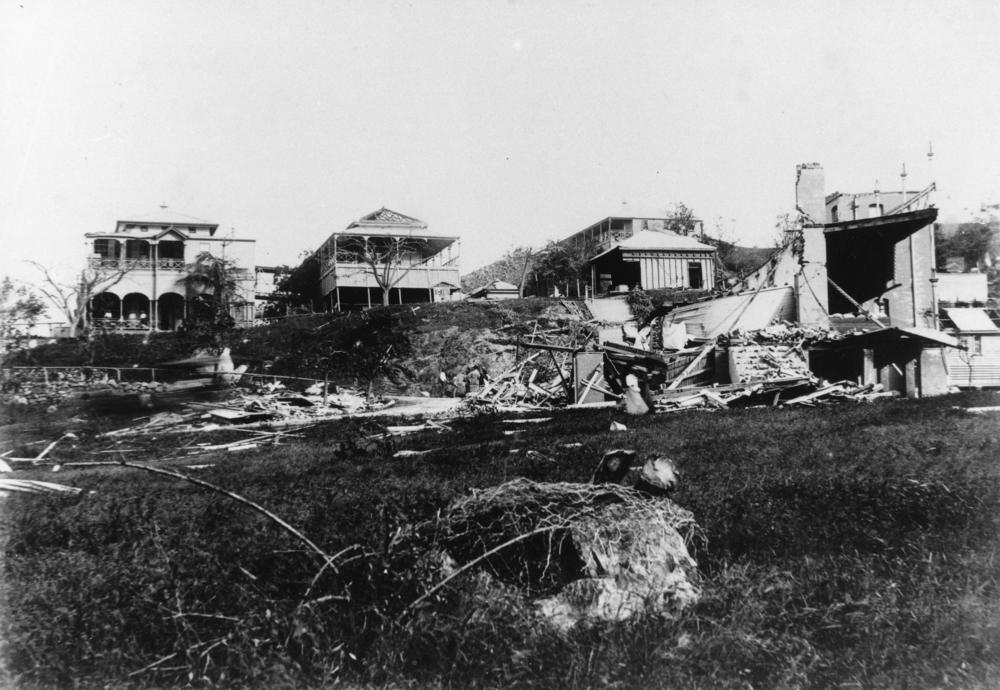
Destruction of the Townsville Hospital's Harvey Ward caused by Cyclone 'Leonta', 1903

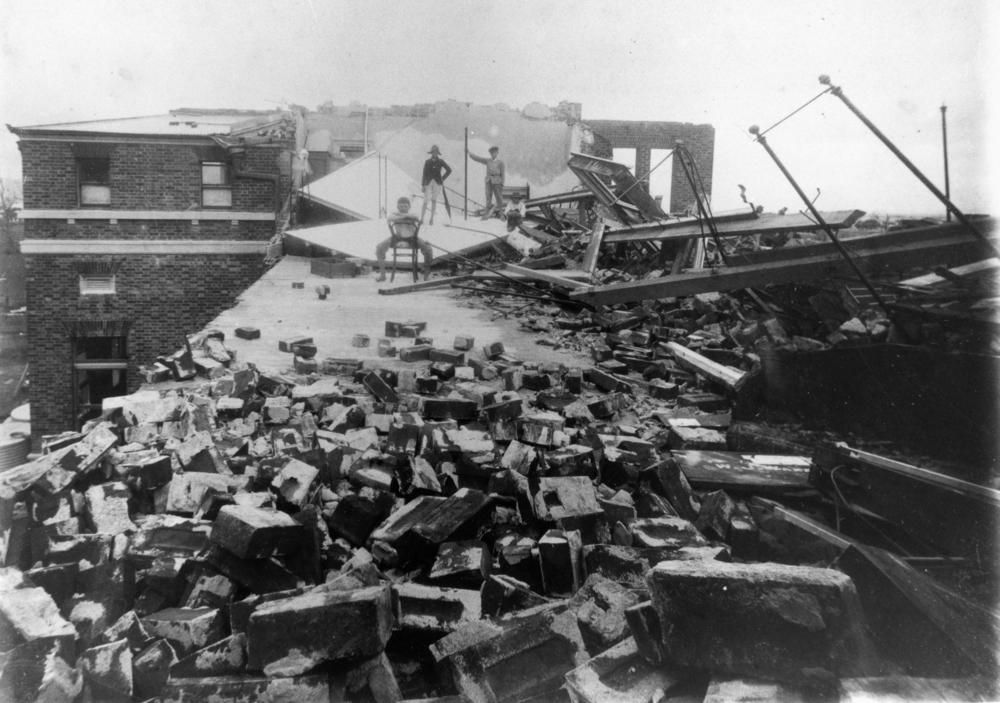
Destruction of part of Townsville Grammar School caused by Cyclone 'Leonta' in 1903

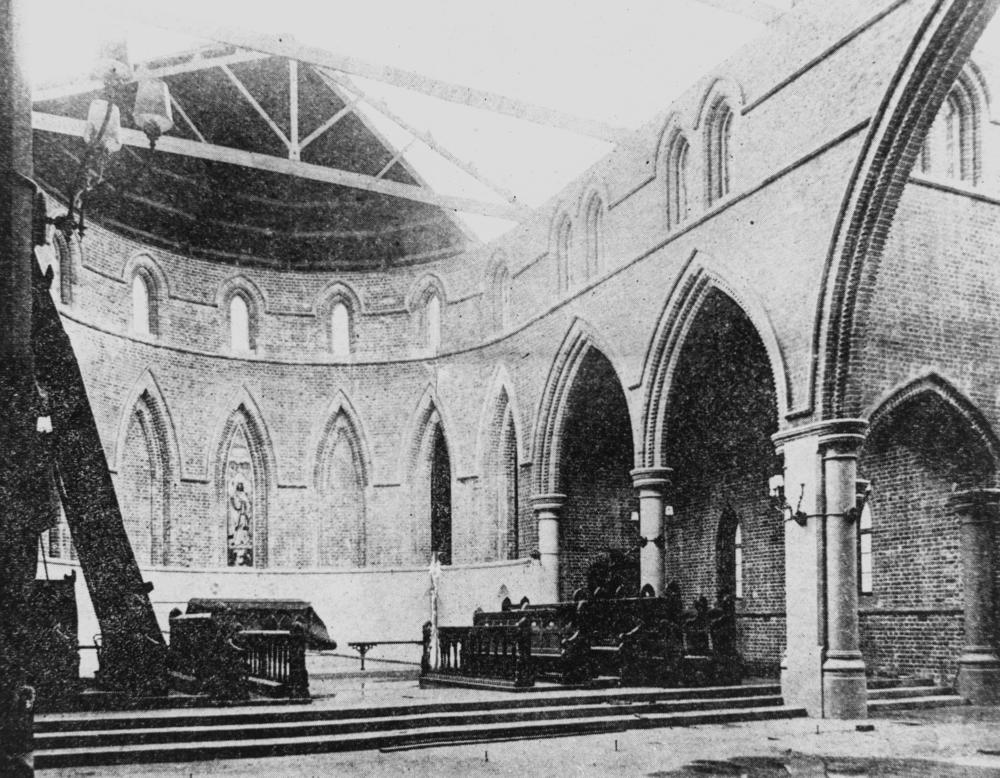
Roof torn off St James' Anglican Cathedral, 1903

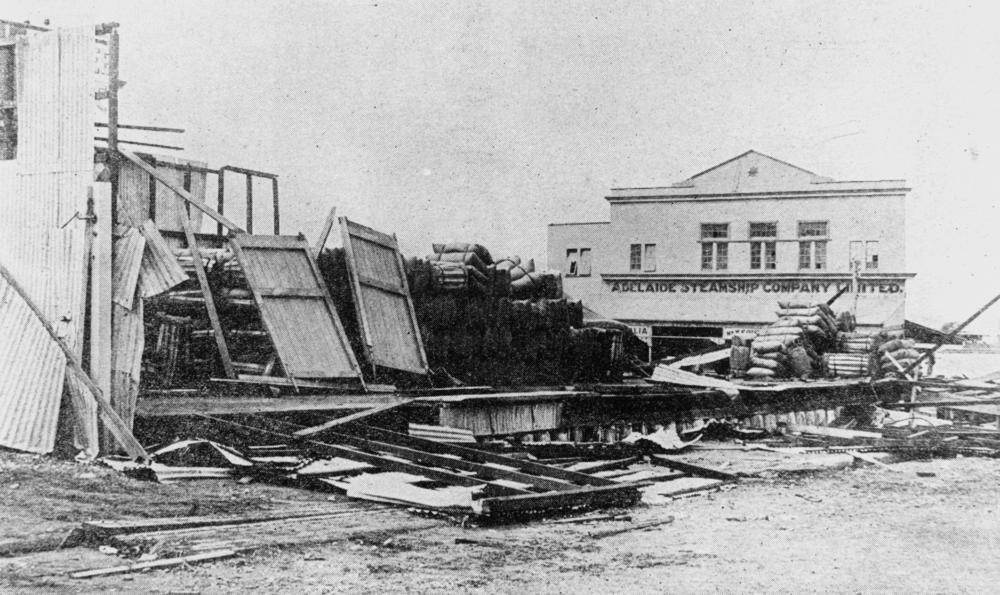
Destruction of the Burns, Philp and Company's Bulk Store caused by Cyclone 'Leonta', 1903

Cyclone Leonta was a tropical cyclone that caused severe damage in North Queensland on 9 March 1903. It lasted for around twelve hours, and was the most damaging cyclone ever to hit Townsville at that time, surpassing Cyclone Sigma of 1896, with approximately 14 lives lost (12 in Townsville and 2 in Charters Towers). It caused approximately £250,000 damage in 1903 terms.

It destroyed the Townsville General Hospital, with several of the lives lost being in the building's collapse, and Townsville Grammar School. It tore the roof off St James Cathedral and Sacred Heart Cathedral and severely damaged the Townsville School of Arts and Queen's Hotel. In Townsville, it was reported that "seven out of every 10 houses between Castle Hill and Eyre St [were] either missing or seriously damaged". Three Methodist churches were destroyed in Townsville and surrounds alone, with the Baptist and Chinese churches also demolished. The T. Whalley & Sons stores and offices, formerly the Norman Hall, and nearby Burns Philp & Co. bulk produce store were completely destroyed.

In Bowen, many houses were damaged or destroyed, with widespread damage to public and commercial buildings. The Bowen railway station saw most of its buildings unroofed, the Burns Philp & Co. store, Drill Shed and municipal baths were destroyed, with many shops and hotels losing verandahs or roofs.

In the town of Ayr, most of the buildings were either destroyed or lost their roofs; the Shire of Burdekin describes both Ayr and Brandon as having been "substantially demolished" by the cyclone. Both the historic Burdekin Shire Council Chambers and Ayr Court House suffered major damage.

On Magnetic Island, the first Picnic Bay Jetty was significantly damaged by the cyclone, necessitating its eventual replacement.

The cyclone was named by notable meteorologist Clement Lindley Wragge.
