= Alva, Queensland =

Alva
- Town
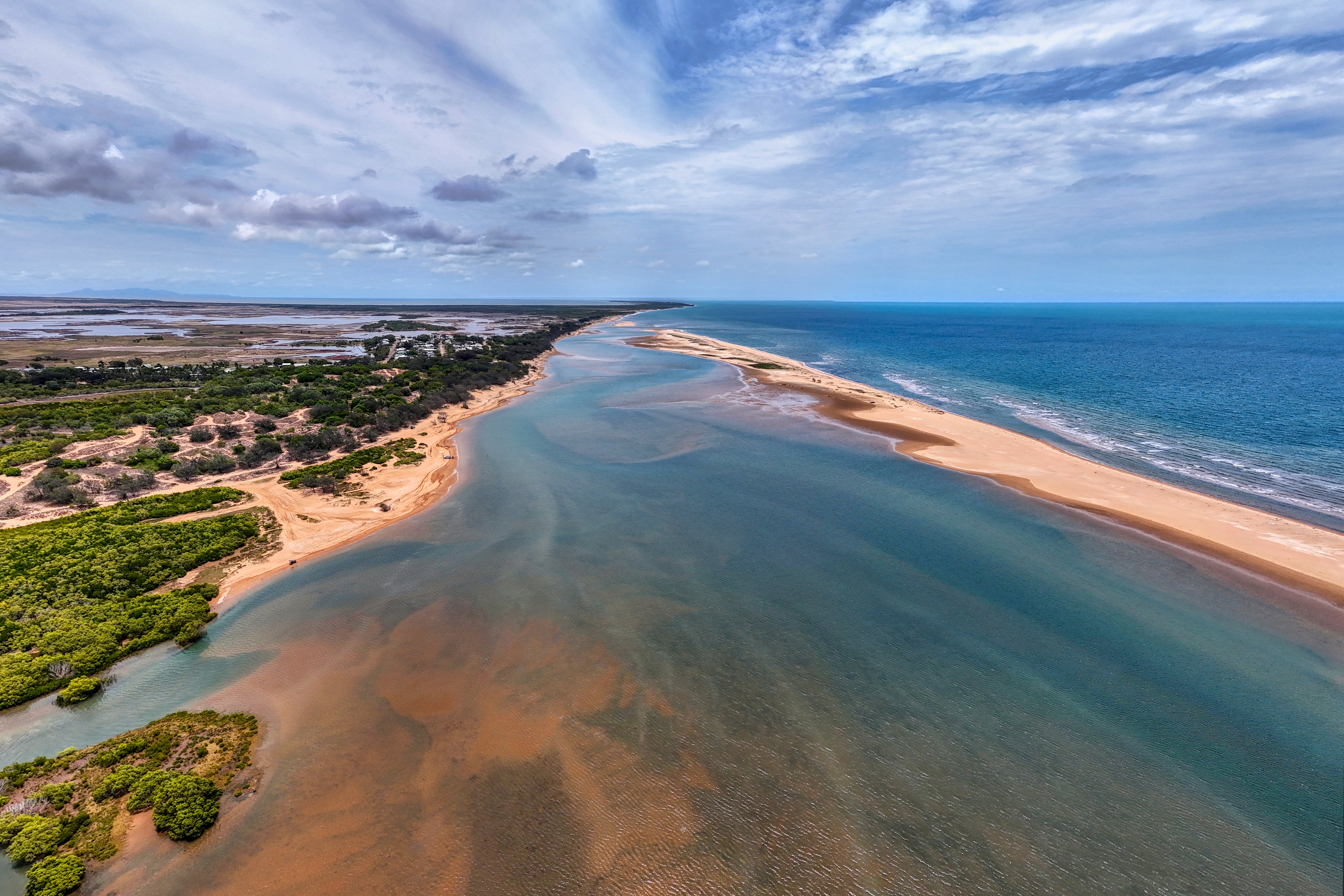
- Alva Beach and Alva

- Interactive map of Alva
- Coordinates: 19.4555°S 147.4811°E
- Country: Australia
- State: Queensland
- LGA: Shire of Burdekin
- Location: 16.8 km (10.4 mi) NE of Ayr; 104 km (65 mi) ESE of Townsville; 1,290 km (800 mi) NNW of Brisbane
- Established: 1926

Government
  - State electorate: Burdekin
  - Federal division: Dawson

Area
  - Total: 123.5 km^{2} (47.7 sq mi)
- Elevation: 8 m (26 ft)

Population
  - Total: 214 (2021 census)
  - Density: 1.733/km^{2} (4.488/sq mi)
- Postcode: 4807
- Mean max temp: 28.2 °C (82.8 °F)
- Mean min temp: 20.6 °C (69.1 °F)
- Annual rainfall: 1,113.1 mm (43.82 in)
Localities around Alva
Coral Sea	Coral Sea	Coral Sea
Colevale	Alva	Coral Sea
Brandon	Ayr	Airdmillan

Alva is a coastal town and locality in the Shire of Burdekin, Queensland, Australia. In the 2021 census, the locality of Alva had a population of 214 people.

== Geography ==
The northern part of Alva is a peninsula extending into the Coral Sea. The peninsula and north-western part of the locality are within the Bowling Green Bay National Park.

Alva Beach, also known as Lynchs Beach, is part of the Burdekin River Delta.

=== Climate ===
Alva Beach has a tropical savanna climate (Köppen: Aw) with a highly erratic wet season from November to April and a somewhat cooler dry season from May to October. The wettest recorded day was 28 January 2020 with 275.4 mm (10.84 in) of rainfall. Extreme temperatures ranged from 40.5 °C (104.9 °F) on 28 November 2018 to 3.3 °C (37.9 °F) on 30 June 2002.

Climate data for Alva Beach (19.46°S 147.48°E) (8 m (26 ft) AMSL) (1997-2025)
Month	Jan	Feb	Mar	Apr	May	Jun	Jul	Aug	Sep	Oct	Nov	Dec	Year
Record high °C (°F)	37.7 (99.9)	37.4 (99.3)	35.0 (95.0)	34.0 (93.2)	32.0 (89.6)	31.0 (87.8)	29.7 (85.5)	31.4 (88.5)	36.2 (97.2)	34.4 (93.9)	40.5 (104.9)	38.7 (101.7)	40.5 (104.9)
Mean daily maximum °C (°F)	31.1 (88.0)	31.1 (88.0)	30.6 (87.1)	29.1 (84.4)	26.9 (80.4)	24.9 (76.8)	24.3 (75.7)	25.0 (77.0)	26.9 (80.4)	28.5 (83.3)	29.7 (85.5)	30.7 (87.3)	28.2 (82.8)
Mean daily minimum °C (°F)	24.9 (76.8)	24.6 (76.3)	23.4 (74.1)	21.2 (70.2)	17.9 (64.2)	15.5 (59.9)	14.6 (58.3)	15.5 (59.9)	19.1 (66.4)	22.0 (71.6)	23.8 (74.8)	24.9 (76.8)	20.6 (69.1)
Record low °C (°F)	18.0 (64.4)	19.0 (66.2)	18.0 (64.4)	11.9 (53.4)	7.0 (44.6)	5.0 (41.0)	5.8 (42.4)	6.7 (44.1)	10.0 (50.0)	13.8 (56.8)	16.4 (61.5)	17.0 (62.6)	5.0 (41.0)
Average precipitation mm (inches)	282.1 (11.11)	278.2 (10.95)	147.7 (5.81)	75.9 (2.99)	41.9 (1.65)	23.8 (0.94)	26.6 (1.05)	18.4 (0.72)	16.5 (0.65)	34.4 (1.35)	68.3 (2.69)	111.3 (4.38)	1,113.1 (43.82)
Average precipitation days (≥ 0.2 mm)	15.0	14.6	13.0	9.6	7.5	6.8	7.0	5.0	6.0	8.0	10.4	11.4	114.3
Average afternoon relative humidity (%)	71	74	68	69	64	64	62	63	65	66	67	67	67
Average dew point °C (°F)	23.6 (74.5)	24.1 (75.4)	22.7 (72.9)	21.2 (70.2)	18.1 (64.6)	16.0 (60.8)	14.9 (58.8)	15.9 (60.6)	18.2 (64.8)	20.0 (68.0)	21.1 (70.0)	22.5 (72.5)	19.9 (67.8)
Source: Bureau of Meteorology (1997-2025)

== History ==
Alva was first surveyed as a town in 1926.

== Demographics ==
In the 2016 census, the locality of Alva had a population of 279 people.

In the 2021 census, the locality of Alva had a population of 214 people.

== Education ==
There are no schools in Alva. The nearest government primary schools are Brandon State School and Kalamia State School, both in neighbouring Brandon to the south-west. The nearest government secondary school is Ayr State High School in neighbouring Ayr to the south. There are also non-government primary and secondary schools in Ayr.

== Amenities ==
The town is home to the Ayr Surf Life Saving Club which opened in 1926 at Alva Beach, the Alva Beach Tourist Park, and a dive shop offering trips to the SS Yongala ship wreck.

== Gallery ==
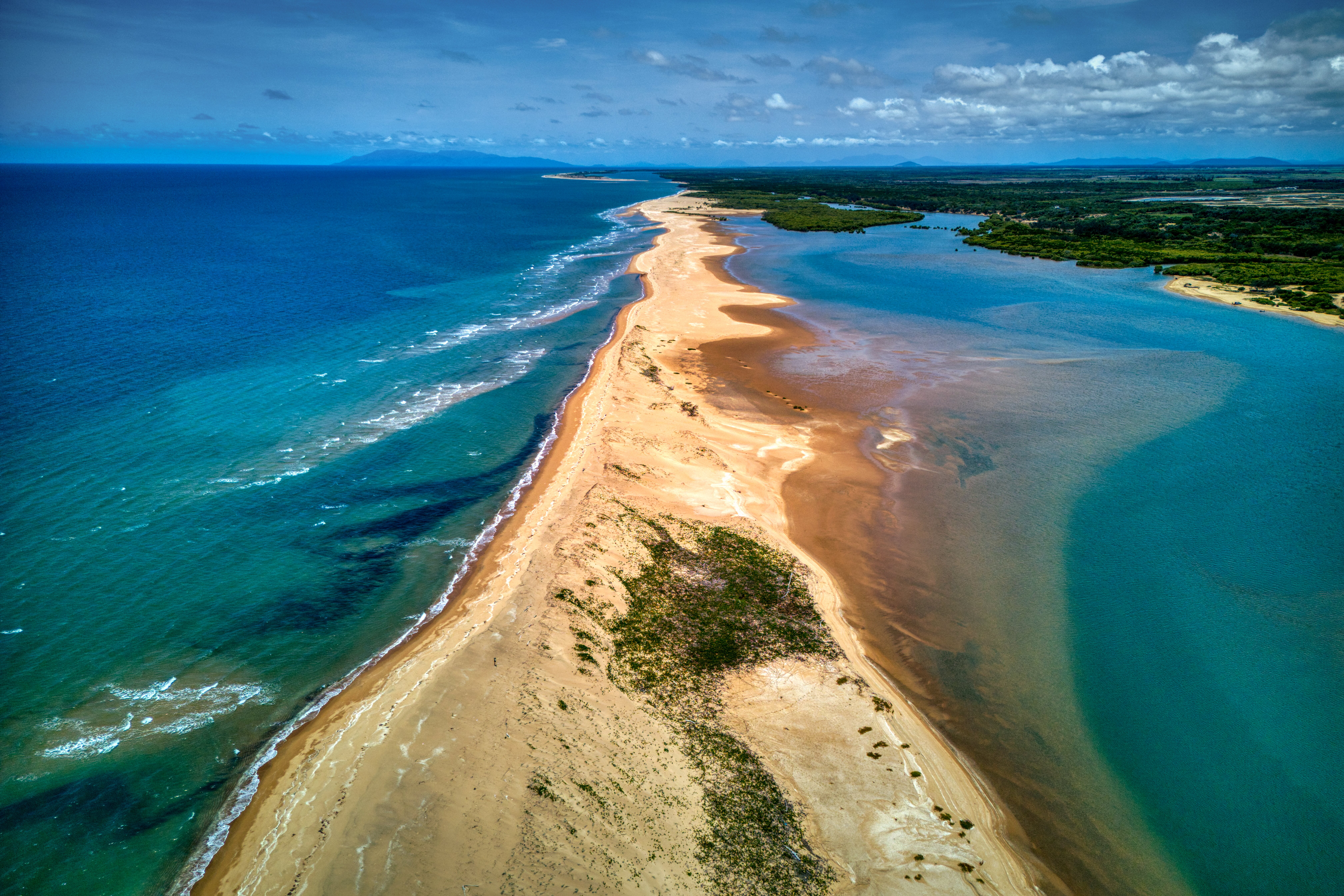
Alva Beach area

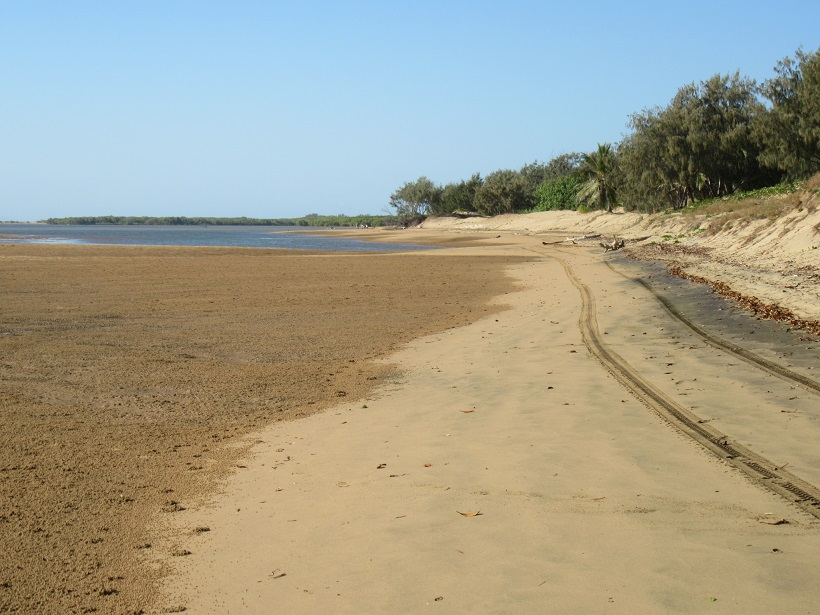
Alva Beach at low tide

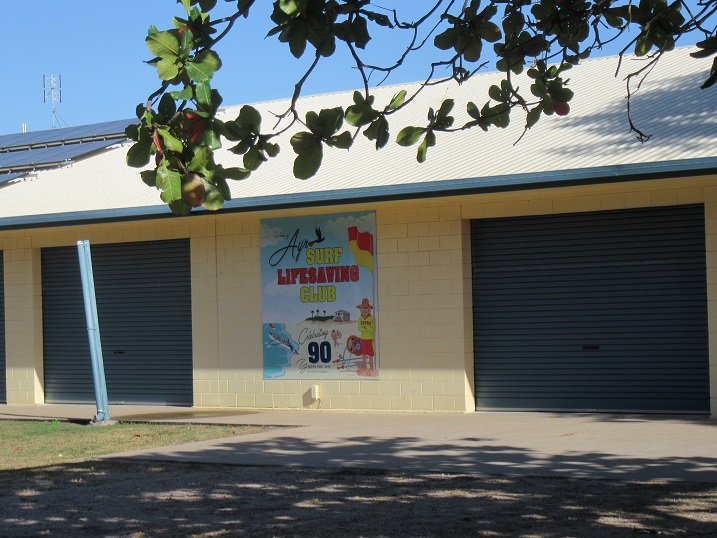
Ayr Surf Life Saving Club

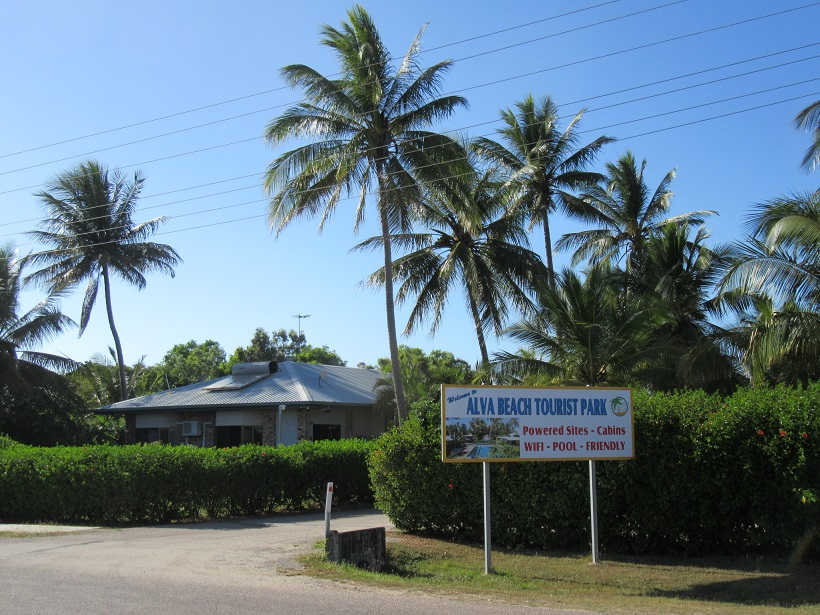
Alva Beach Tourist Park

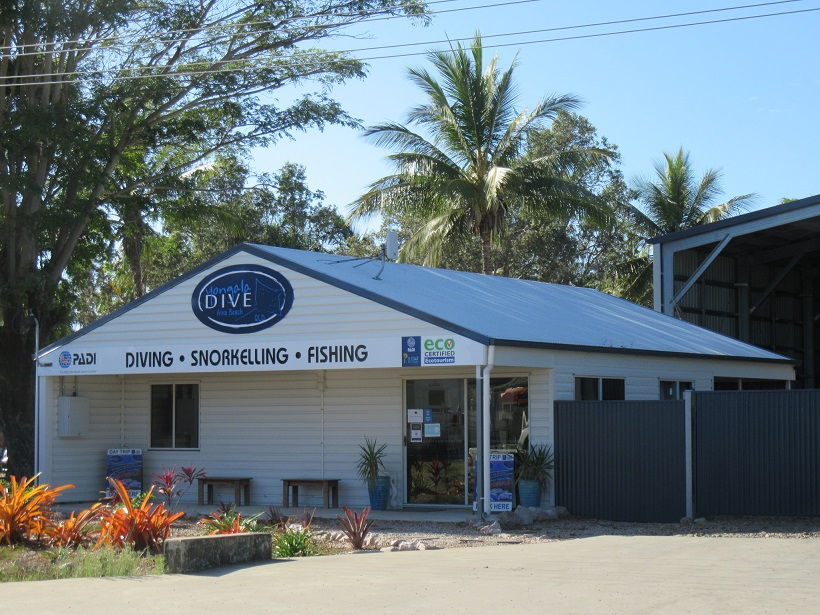
Yongala Dive shop
