= Jarvisfield, Queensland =

Jarvisfield
- Suburb
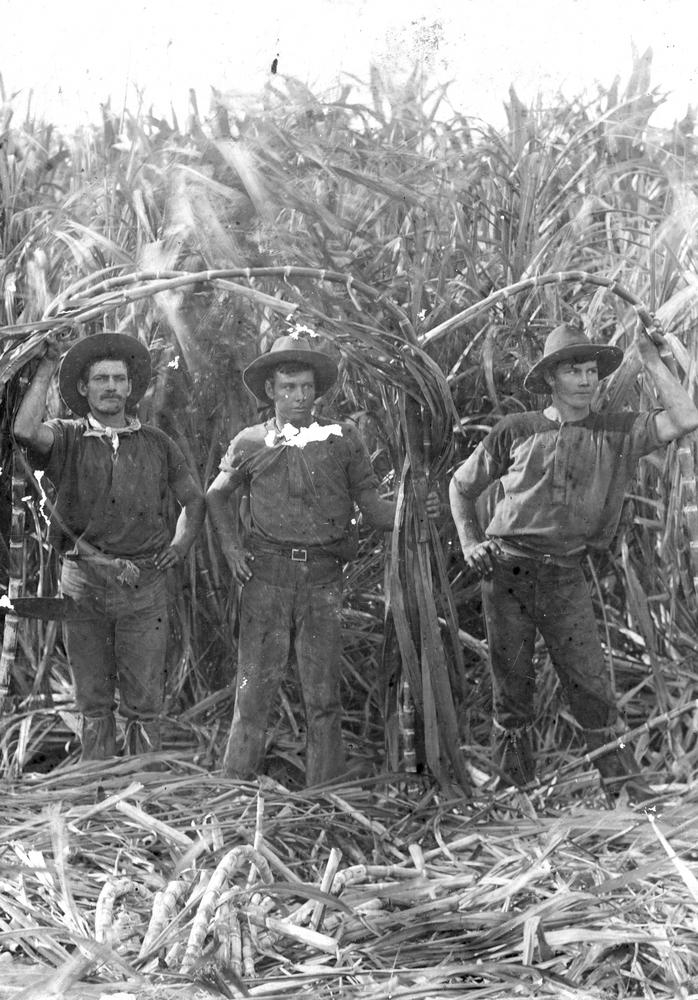
- The Olsen brothers, Sugarcane farmers in Jarvisfield, circa 1920

- Interactive map of Jarvisfield
- Coordinates: 19.5753°S 147.4911°E
- Country: Australia
- State: Queensland
- LGA: Shire of Burdekin
- Location: 8.7 km (5.4 mi) SE of Ayr; 97.7 km (60.7 mi) SE of Townsville; 1,267 km (787 mi) NNW of Brisbane

Government
  - State electorate: Burdekin
  - Federal division: Dawson

Area
  - Total: 104.1 km^{2} (40.2 sq mi)

Population
  - Total: 343 (2021 census)
  - Density: 3.295/km^{2} (8.534/sq mi)
- Time zone: UTC+10:00 (AEST)
- Postcode: 4807
Suburbs around Jarvisfield
Airdmillan	Airdmillan	Coral Sea
Ayr	Jarvisfield	Coral Sea
McDesme	Carstairs	Rita Island

Jarvisfield is a coastal rural locality in the Shire of Burdekin, Queensland, Australia. In the 2021 census, Jarvisfield had a population of 343 people.

== Geography ==
Jarvisfield is bounded by the Coral Sea to the east, the Burdekin River to the south and Plantation Creek to the north.

The locality is flat low-lying land (below 10 metres above sea level). Most of the locality is freehold and used for growing sugarcane. However, the most eastern coastal parts of the locality are not developed and are at risk of coastal erosion from storms and from sea levels rising.

A cane tramway through the locality carries harvested sugarcane to the local sugar mills, Pioneer Sugar Mill and Kalamia Sugar Mill, both located in Brandon.

== History ==
The Budekin River was explored by John Clements Wickham in HMS Beagle in 1839. In 1859 the lower Burdekin River was explored by Captain Sinclair and James Gordon from Bowen. After the Separation of Queensland in December 1859, the newly established Queensland Parliament sent further expeditions to assess the potential of the Burdekin River for settlement, leading to the area being officially opened for settlement from 1 January 1861, leading to the "Great Land Grab".

In 1861 Edward Spencer Antill (who was a son of the distinguished colonist Henry Colden Antill) arrived in the region to take up land. The following year, he selected a large area of land along the lower Burdekin River for a sheep station which he named Jarvisfield after the Antill family estate near Picton. Jarvisfield Station was later bought by Robert Towns and Alexander Stewart, both of Sydney. The present day locality takes its name from the Jarvisfield Station (although it is not as large in area as that pastoral run).

In 1863–1864 there was an attempt to establish a port called Wickham on the north bank of the Burdekin River near the Jarvisfield Estate, despite Captain Wickham himself being dubious as to its viability noting that the river had two entrances, both very shallow, and that the river banks were vulnerable to flooding. However, the project proceeded but ultimately failed due to constant problems with mosquitoes, difficulties in navigating to upper reaches of the Burdekin through much of the year and problems with coastal erosion from storms.

Initially Jarvisfield Station was used for sheep and cattle grazing. In 1869, Alexander Stuart attempted to grow sugar as did a number of other local farmers but inconsistent rainfall was a problem, so cattle grazing was the most common use of the land in the area. It was only when it was realised that the freshwater lagoons in the Burdekin Delta could be used for irrigation that the reliable cultivation of sugarcane became possible and far more profitable than cattle grazing. It was possible for a farmer to make a good living from a small block of land with sugarcane compared with a large parcel of land needed to make a good living from cattle. This raised the value of land and larger estates, such as Jarvisfield Station, were subdivided. This brought more farmers into the area and with them the extra labour needed to grow sugarcane. This increase in population led to the development of towns and service industries in the Burdekin district.

Jarvisfield State School opened on 29 March 1915. It celebrated its centenary on 3 October 2015.

== Demographics ==
In the 2016 census, Jarvisfield had a population of 367 people.

In the 2021 census, Jarvisfield had a population of 343 people.

== Education ==
Jarvisfield State School is a government primary (Prep-6) school for boys and girls at 516 Rita Island Road (19.6009°S 147.4606°E). In 2016, the school had an enrolment of 13 students with 2 teachers (1 full-time equivalent) and 5 non-teaching staff (2 full-time equivalent). In 2018, the school had an enrolment of 13 students with 2 teachers (1 full-time equivalent) and 3 non-teaching staff (2 full-time equivalent).

There are no secondary schools in Jarvisfield. The nearest government secondary school is Ayr State High School in neighbouring Ayr to the west.

There are also non-government schools in Ayr.
