= George Brabon =

Australian cricketer (born 1957)

Personal information
- Born: 2 August 1957 (age 69); Ayr, Queensland, Australia
- Batting: Right-handed
- Bowling: Right-arm fast-medium
- Role: Bowler

Domestic team information
- Years: Team
- 1978/79–1981/82: Queensland
- Source: Cricinfo, 1 October 2020

George Brabon (born 2 August 1957) is an Australian cricketer. He played in six first-class and three List A matches for Queensland between 1978 and 1982.

== Cricket career ==
Brabon was a pace bowler who began his cricket career in Rockhampton playing for the Frenchville Falcons. In 1978 he was first selected for the Queensland state team for a tour game against England and it was noted that he was one of only a handful of country cricketers to make it into the state team since 1958. In his debut he dismissed Geoff Boycott for six with his eleventh delivery in first-class cricket which earned his team-mates a $1000 bonus that had been offered by the Queensland company PGH Ceramics if Boycott could be dismissed for less than twenty.

After his debut Brabon was not reselected in the state team until late 1981 when he replaced Carl Rackemann who had suffered a shoulder injury. Overall he took twelve wickets at an average of 34.75 for Queensland in five matches during the 1981/82 Sheffield Shield season and took three wickets at an average of 42.33 in three games during the List A cup however he did not play for Queensland again.

== See also ==
- List of Queensland first-class cricketers
