= Burdekin Catholic High School =

Location
- 45 Gibson St; Ayr, Queensland, 4807; Australia; 19.56483°S 147.41390°E

Information
- Type: Private, co-ed, secondary
- Motto: One in Christ
- Established: 1953
- Founder: Marist Brothers
- Principal: Craig Frattini
- Staff: 89
- Teaching staff: 58
- Grades: 7-12
- Enrolment: 548 (2013)
- Classrooms: 17 Classrooms, 3 Science Labs, 3 Computer Labs, 1 Music Room, 1 Home Economics/Hospitality Room
- Campus type: Rural
- Houses: Marcellin, Clarence and Polding
- Colours: Maroon, white, blue
- Slogan: One In Christ
- Song: Sub Tuum
- Website: www.bchs.catholic.edu.au/index.html

Burdekin Catholic High School (commonly referred to as BCH or by its official acronym BCHS) is a private, co-educational Catholic secondary school in the town of Ayr, Queensland, Australia. The school is part of the Roman Catholic Diocese of Townsville. It is one of two high schools in the town, the other being Ayr State High School.

== History ==
The school was established in 1974 as a result of the amalgamation of Edmund Campion College, founded by the Marist Brothers in 1953, and St Francis Xavier Convent High School, founded by the Sisters of the Good Samaritan in 1945.

== Student population ==
The school has a population of 548 students. The school has a reputation locally as being a progressive Christian school, with students born out of wedlock and students from all other faiths.

== Facilities ==
There are two multi-story buildings and an auditorium that used to function as a church. The school curriculum is the same as all other Queensland schools with the addition of Roman Catholic Religion.
