= Ayr Court House =

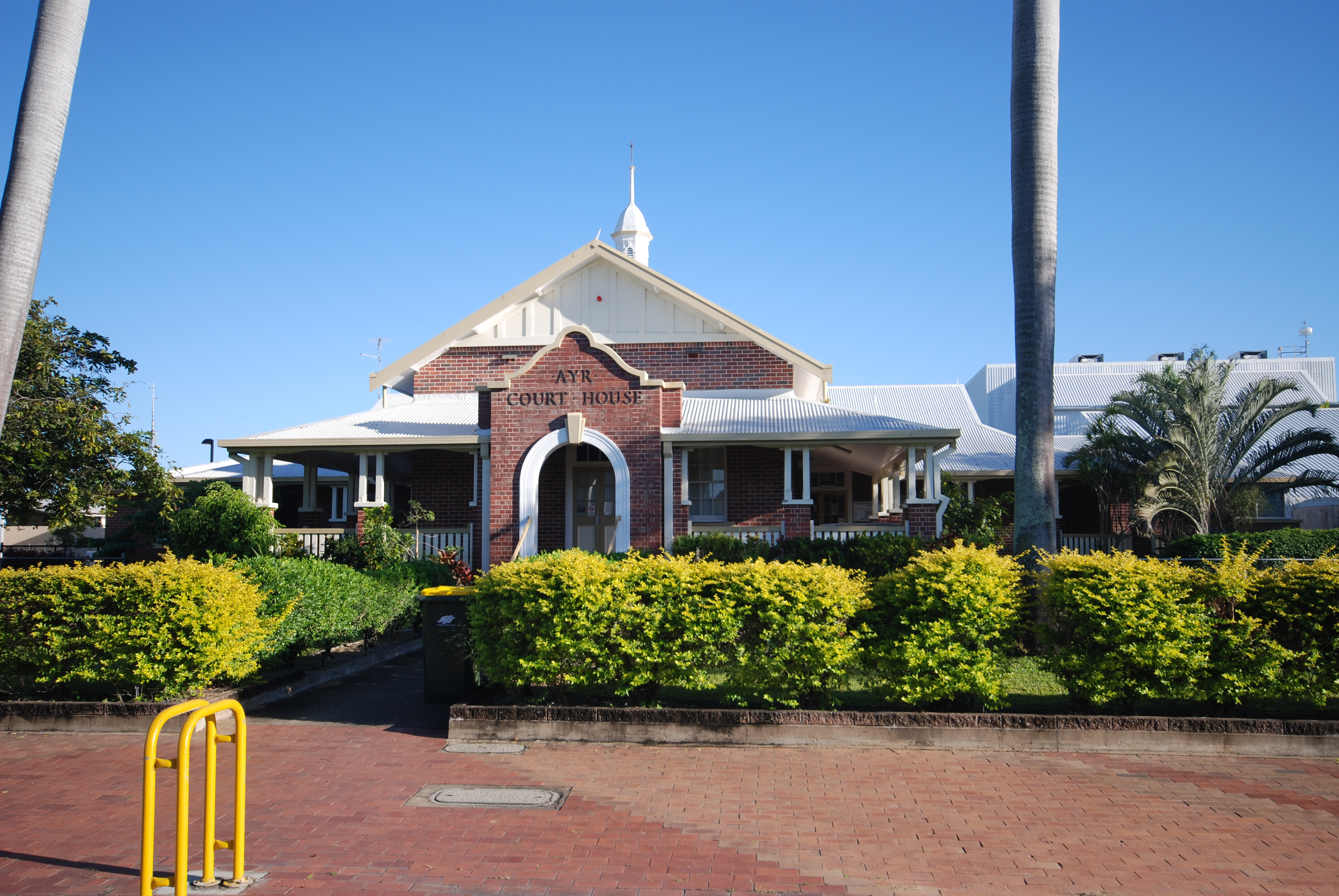
- Ayr Court House, 2009

- Location within Queensland Location within Australia
- 19.5768°S 147.4039°E
- Location: 163 Queen Street, Ayr, Shire of Burdekin, Queensland, Australia

History
- Design period: 1919–1930s (interwar period)
- Built: 1935–1941

Site notes
- Architect: Douglas Francis Woodcraft Roberts
- Architectural style: Classicism

Queensland Heritage Register
- Official name: Ayr Court House
- Type: state heritage (landscape, built)
- Designated: 13 January 1995
- Reference no.: 601126
- Significant period: 1930s (historical); 1930s (fabric); 1935–ongoing (social)
- Significant components: garden/grounds, court house, roof/ridge ventilator/s / fleche/s
- Builders: day labour

Ayr Court House is a heritage-listed courthouse at 163 Queen Street, Ayr, Shire of Burdekin, Queensland, Australia. It was designed by Douglas Francis Woodcraft Roberts and built from 1935 to 1941 by day labour. It was added to the Queensland Heritage Register on 13 January 1995.

== History ==
Constructed in 1935 on a site adjacent to the existing 1897 court house, this was the third court house in Ayr.

The Burdekin River region was first settled in the 1860s, and the town of Ayr was surveyed in 1882. Tenders was called for a Court House and Police Station in Ayr in late 1882, and a building was erected in 1883 which comprised the police quarters, lock-up and court room. This building was situated on Allotment 6, bounded by Queen, Khedive (now Mackenzie), Omar (now Graham) and Bey (now Young) Streets. The Post and Telegraph Office and Residence were also located on this block. The town grew in support of the increasing number of sugar plantations and small sugar growers establishing themselves in the Burdekin region.

By late 1896 the court room was inadequate for court purposes. Construction on a new court house commenced in 1897, the former room being taken over for use by the police. The new court house was built on a site south east of the police building, at the corner of Queen and Khedive Streets.

Ayr was almost completely destroyed by Cyclone Leonta in 1903; much of the town was rebuilt after the cyclone. Part of the court house roof was damaged during the cyclone.

Ayr and the surrounding district experienced an unprecedented period of growth through the 1920s and 1930s as a result of the expansion of the sugar industry, and other developments in the district from the turn of the century. The formation of the Ayr Tramway Joint Board and the opening of the railway connecting Ayr and Stuart (Townsville) in 1901 overcame many difficulties previously associated with transporting sugar to the port in Townsville. The Ayr-Stuart line became a government railway in January 1913.

The early farmers in the Ayr district found that the supply of water to irrigate their cane crops was inadequate. Several irrigation schemes were proposed, however none eventuated until the Queensland Government approved an irrigation scheme for the district in July 1916. The Inkerman Supply Board was constituted in February 1917 and the Irrigation Plant was opened in May 1922. While the Great Depression was affecting most other parts of the country, the sugar towns of Queensland experienced steady growth and stable economies.

Additions to the court house in 1928 provided an office for the Department of Labour. By the early 1930s, the court house was again inadequate for the demands being placed upon it, and further additions to the building were proposed. In a deputation in 1934 to the Hon John Dash, then MLA for Mundingburra (which included Ayr), members of the Ayr Progress Association presented a case for a new building, citing, amongst other reasons, the lack of room at the court house; the recent approval by the Commonwealth Government for a new Post Office and Residence in Ayr; and the importance of the business being transacted on daily and weekly bases in Ayr, as reasons for a new building. Approval was given for the erection of a new court house in December 1934, which would include a court room, witness rooms, rooms for a police officer, Clerk of Petty Sessions and four clerks, and a public space.

Drawings for the new court house were prepared in 1935 by architect DFW Roberts, employed in the Queensland Works Department (Andrew Baxter Leven was Chief Architect at this time). The Ayr Court House is based on the early traditional T-shaped plan of court houses, which were most commonly constructed in timber. The Ayr and Home Hill Court Houses are the only two examples of brick versions of this "T" plan form. Most other court houses of this period were adopting different plan forms. Provision was made in the drawings for future additions to be made to the verandahs at either end of the "T". Three distinct entrances to the building separated members of the public who had business dealings with the Clerk of Petty Sessions, from those who were appearing in the court house as a witness, or who were attending a court hearing. A description of the new court house prior to its completion concluded by stating that "The Buildings will be an imposing structure and should prove an acquisition to the Architecture of the City".

During the 1930s Depression, Labor Premier William Forgan Smith established a government initiated works scheme under the Income (Unemployment Relief) Act (1930) to create employment. This involved the employment of architects, foremen, labourers and the use of local materials in the design and construction of government buildings such as court houses, government offices and state schools. The Ayr court house is a fine example of the brick buildings erected through this work scheme.

The court house was completed and officially opened in March 1936, and the former court house taken over for use as the police station shortly after. Offices in the building were occupied also by staff of other government departments, such as the Agriculture and Stock Department. Additional offices were constructed in 1941, at the south west end of the building. Landscaping of the court house grounds was undertaken in the early 1950s.

== Description ==
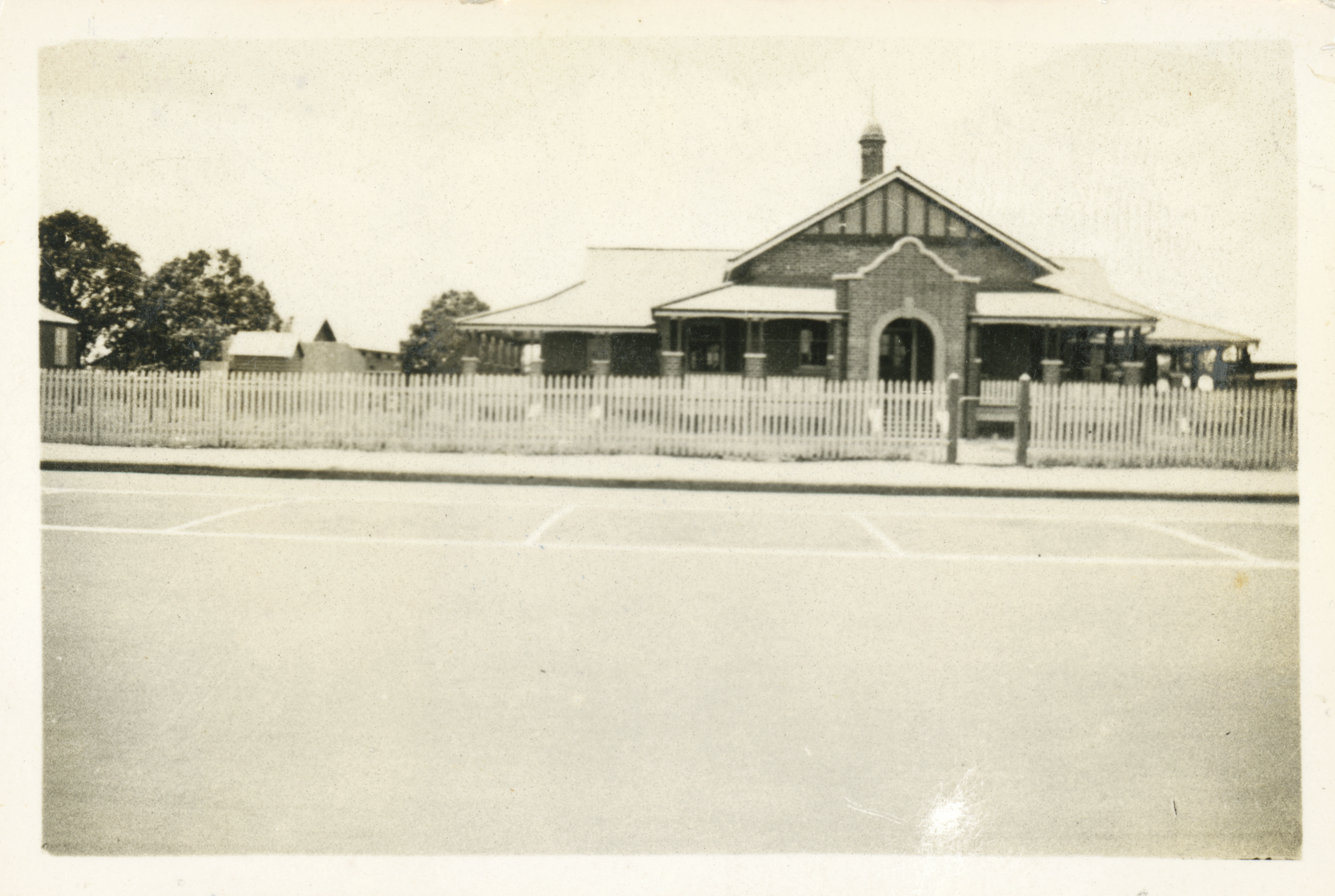
Ayr Court House, 1938

Ayr Court House is a single-storeyed red brick building. The gabled and half-gabled roof is clad in corrugated steel and is surmounted by a painted copper flèche. The roof's original russet-coloured fibro cement slates, have been replaced with corrugated steel sheeting. The wide verandahs on four sides have timber balustrading and paired posts on brick piers. The entrance portico is marked with a decorative parapet.

The Ayr Court House is one of several buildings that contribute to the town's civic precinct in the main street, Queen Street. The police station, court house, town hall, library and post office dominate the north-west side of Queen Street between Mackenzie and Young Streets.

== Heritage listing ==
Ayr Court House was listed on the Queensland Heritage Register on 13 January 1995 having satisfied the following criteria.

The place is important in demonstrating the evolution or pattern of Queensland's history.

Completed in 1936 as the third court house in Ayr, this building survives as an example of the development of Ayr as a commercial and official centre for the surrounding district from the late 19th century, and of the prosperity accompanying the expansion of settlement and the sugar industry in the Ayr district during the early 20th century.

Designed and constructed as part of a Government initiated Works scheme created to generate employment throughout Queensland during the 1930s, the Ayr Court House is also a fine example of the work completed under this scheme.

The place is important in demonstrating the principal characteristics of a particular class of cultural places.

The Ayr Court House is a good example of a substantial brick court house which reflects the high standard of Government buildings in Queensland designed by the Department of Public Works during the early-mid twentieth century.

The place is important because of its aesthetic significance.

The form, scale and materials of the building, contribute to the Queen Street streetscape and Ayr townscape.
