= Brandon, Queensland =

Brandon
- Town
- Interactive map of Brandon
- Coordinates: 19.5541°S 147.3547°E
- Country: Australia
- State: Queensland
- LGA: Shire of Burdekin
- Location: 6.4 km (4.0 mi) WNW of Ayr; 82.1 km (51.0 mi) ESE of Townsville; 1,323 km (822 mi) NNW of Brisbane

Government
  - State electorate: Burdekin
  - Federal division: Dawson

Area
  - Total: 110.5 km^{2} (42.7 sq mi)

Population
  - Total: 1,088 (2021 census)
  - Density: 9.846/km^{2} (25.501/sq mi)
- Time zone: UTC+10:00 (AEST)
- Postcode: 4808
Localities around Brandon
Barratta	Colevale	Alva
Barratta	Brandon	Ayr
Barratta	Airville	McDesme

Brandon is a rural town and locality in the Shire of Burdekin, Queensland, Australia. In the 2021 census, the locality of Brandon had a population of 1,088 people.

== History ==
Brandon was surveyed as a site for a township in 1882 and the first allotments were sold later that year. The town is named after Henry Brandon a sugar pioneer in the Mackay and Lower Burdekin regions. Henry Brandon was also the son-in-law of the colonist, Korah Halcomb Wills.

Brandon Post Office opened on 6 September 1883. Prior to that a Receiving office called Pioneer Estate, Lower Burdekin had serviced the area. The Receiving office name was changed to Brandon in August 1883.

Brandon Provisional School opened in the town on 9 April 1888. It became Brandon State School on 11 July 1898.

Kalamia State School opened beside the Kalamia Sugar Mill on 18 July 1928.

== Demographics ==
In the 2006 census, the town of Brandon had a population of 783 people.

In the 2011 census, the locality of Brandon had a population of 1,267 people.

In the 2016 census, the locality of Brandon had a population of 1,094 people.

In the 2021 census, the locality of Brandon had a population of 1,088 people.

== Heritage listings ==
Brandon has a number of heritage-listed sites, including:

- St Patrick's Catholic Church, 27 Spiller Street

== Economy ==
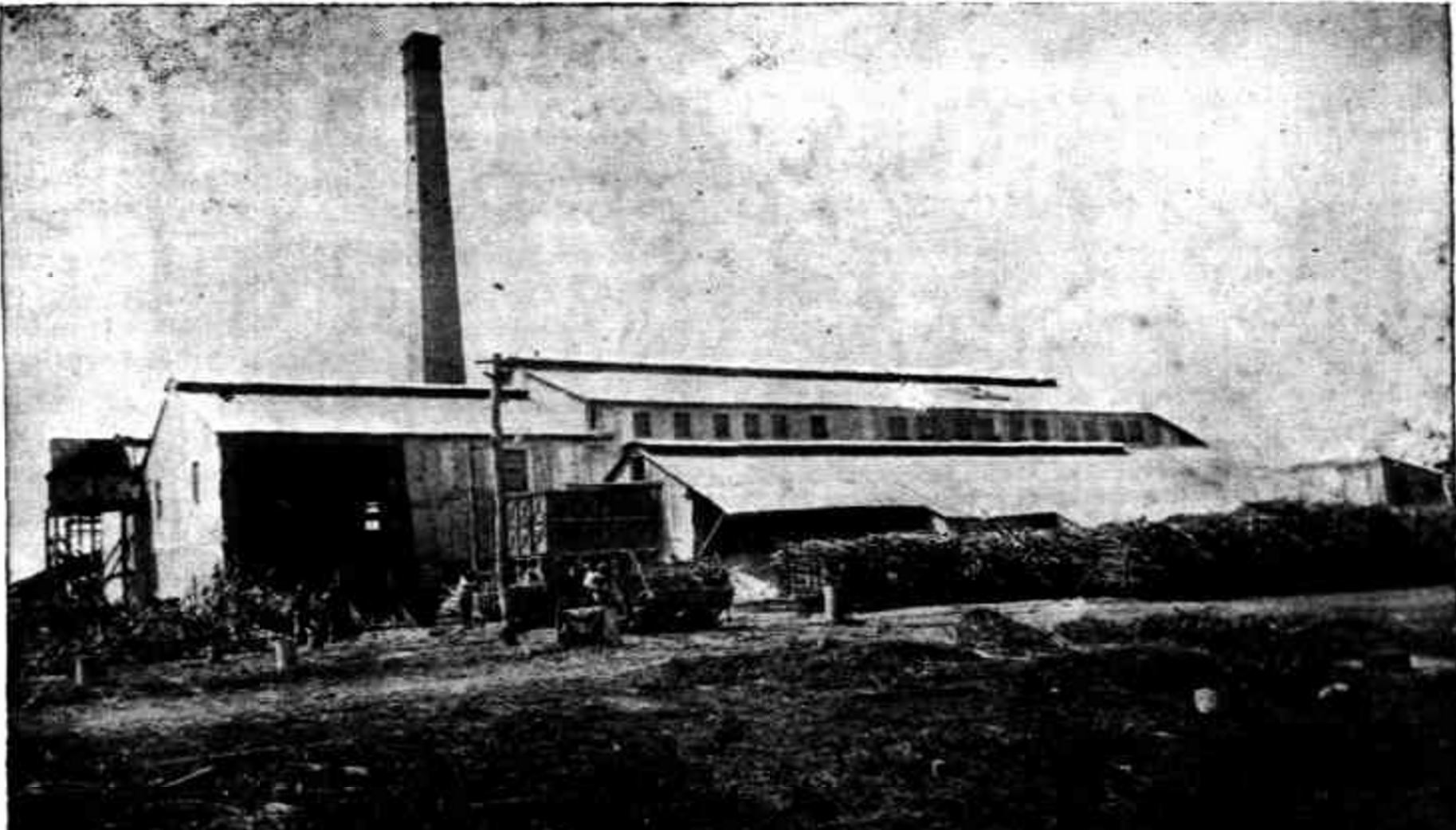
Kalamia Sugar Mill, 1901

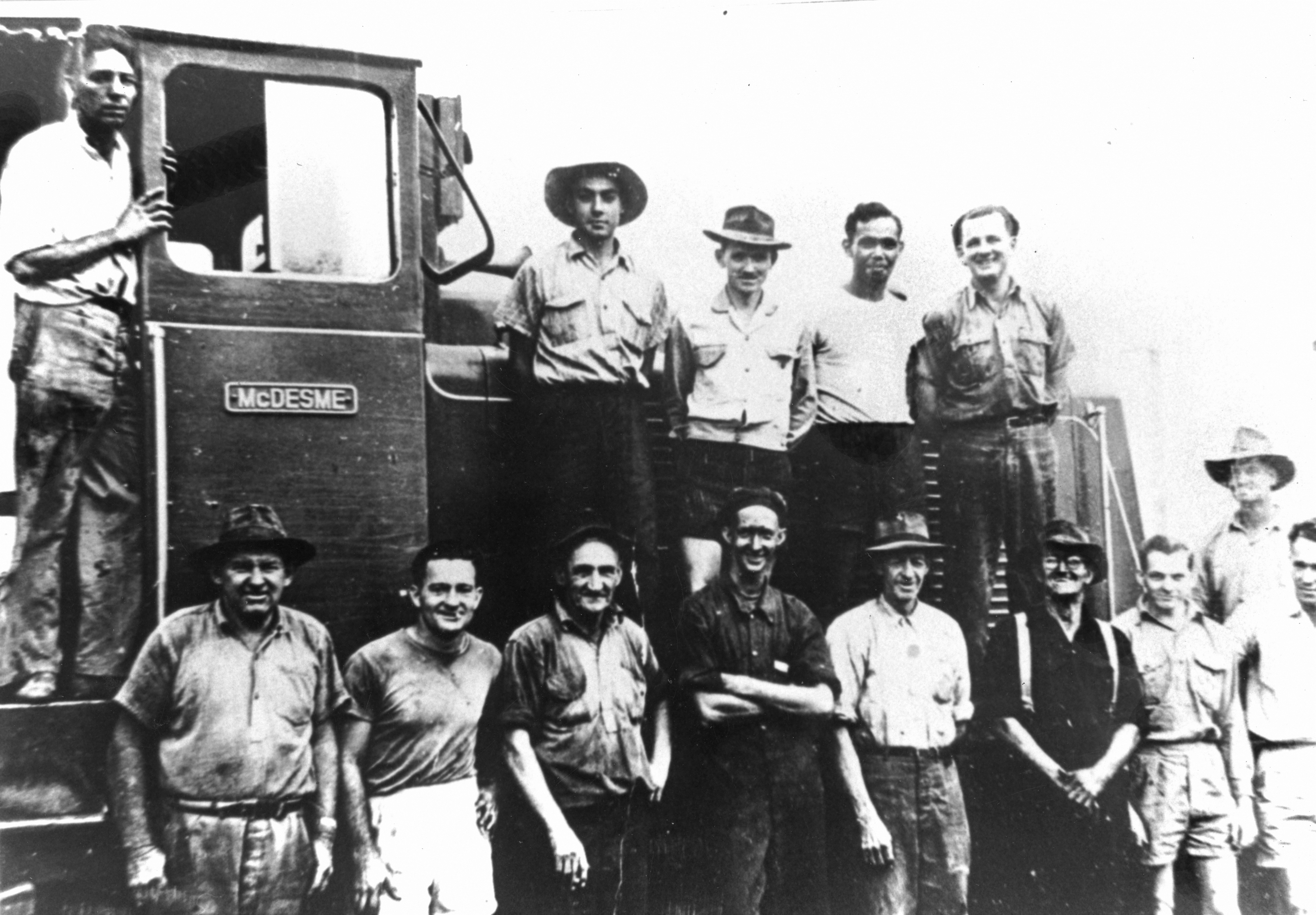
Pioneer Mill tramway operations workers with locomotive McDesme

Brandon is a sugarcane growing area with underground water supplies to irrigate crops. Wilmar Sugar Australia operates two sugar mills in Brandon, the Kalamia Sugar Mill in the north-east of the locality on Lilliesmere Road beside the Lilliesmere Lagoon (19.5229°S 147.4163°E) and the Pioneer Sugar Mill in the west of the locality on Pioneer Mill Road (19.5583°S 147.3309°E).

== Education ==
Brandon State School is a government primary (Prep–6) school for boys and girls on Drysdale Street (19.5537°S 147.3485°E). In 2017, the school had an enrolment of 45 students with 4 teachers and 6 non-teaching staff (4 full-time equivalent).

Kalamia State School is a government primary (Prep–6) school for boys and girls on Lilliesmere Road (19.5185°S 147.4176°E). In 2017, the school had an enrolment of 14 students with 1 teacher and 5 non-teaching staff (2 full-time equivalent).

There are no secondary schools in Brandon. The nearest government secondary school is Ayr State High School in neighbouring Ayr to the east.

== Sport ==
Pioneer Park Speedway is a motorcycle speedway venue to the south west on Bruce Highway. The track has been a significant venue for important speedway events, including qualifying rounds of the Speedway World Championship and the final of the Australian Solo Championship.

== See also ==
- List of sugar mills in Queensland
- List of tramways in Queensland
