= Shire of Burdekin =

Coordinates: 19°34′32.97″S 147°24′18.21″E

- Local government area
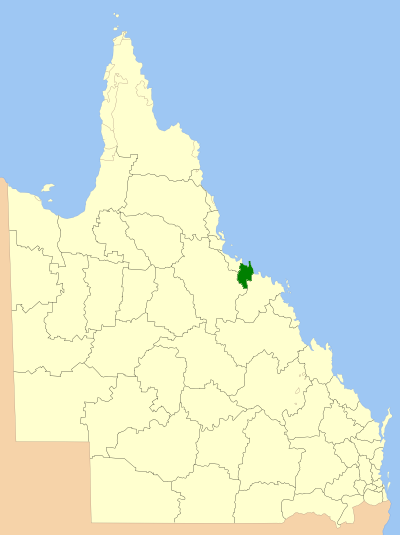
- Location within Queensland

- Interactive map of Shire of Burdekin
- Country: Australia
- State: Queensland
- Region: North Queensland
- Established: 1888
- Council seat: Ayr

Government
  - Mayor: Pierina Dalle Cort
  - State electorate: Burdekin
  - Federal divisions: Dawson; Kennedy

Area
  - Total: 5,044 km^{2} (1,947 sq mi)

Population
  - Total: 16,692 (2021 census)
  - Density: 3.3093/km^{2} (8.5710/sq mi)
- Website: Shire of Burdekin
LGAs around Shire of Burdekin
| City of Townsville | Coral Sea | Coral Sea |
| City of Townsville | Shire of Burdekin | Coral Sea |
| Charters Towers | Charters Towers | Whitsunday |

The Shire of Burdekin is a local government area located in North Queensland, Australia in the Dry Tropics region. The district is located between Townsville and Bowen in the delta of the Burdekin River. The shire covers an area of 5,044 square kilometres (1,947 sq mi). It has existed as a local government entity since 1888. In the 2021 census, the Shire of Burdekin had a population of 16,692 people.

== History ==
Yuru (also known as Juru, Euronbba, Juru, Mal Mal, Malmal) is an Australian Aboriginal language spoken on Yuru country. The Yuru language region includes the landscape within the local government boundaries of the Shire of Burdekin, including the town of Home Hill.

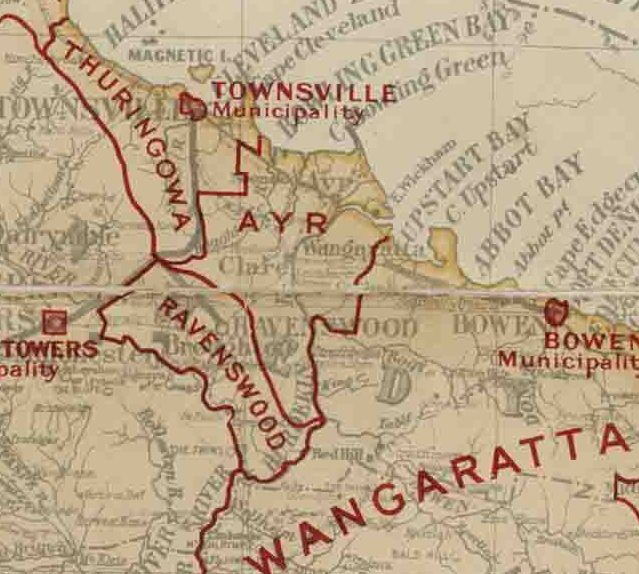
Map of Ayr Division and its adjacent local government areas, March 1902

On 16 January 1888, the Ayr Division was created out of Subdivision 3 of the Thuringowa Division in 1888 under the Divisional Boards Act 1887.

With the passage of the Local Authorities Act 1902, Ayr Division became the Shire of Ayr on 31 March 1903.

On 12 June 1982, the Shire of Ayr was renamed the Shire of Burdekin, a change long desired by the residents of Home Hill.

Council members were elected to represent different divisions within the shire until the election of March 1994 at which all council members are elected by all shire residents. The title of Mayor replaced the former title of Shire Chairman and the title of Shire Clerk was replaced by Chief Executive Officer from that same election.

New shire chambers were opened on 9 October 1999. The cost was $2.8 million.

From 2000, council elections were held every four years to elect a mayor and ten councillors. From 2008, this was reduced to a mayor and six councillors.

== Facilities ==
The public library headquarters of the Burdekin Shire Council Library Services is located at 108 Graham Street, Ayr. The Burdekin Shire also operate a public library in Home Hill at 77–79 Ninth Avenue. Both libraries opened in 1984.

== Towns and localities ==
The Shire of Burdekin includes the following settlements:

- Airdmillan
- Airville
- Alva
- Ayr
- Barratta
- Brandon
- Carstairs
- Clare
- Colevale
- Cromarty
- Dalbeg
- Eight Mile Creek
- Fredericksfield
- Giru
- Groper Creek
- Home Hill
- Horseshoe Lagoon
- Inkerman
- Jarvisfield
- Jerona
- Kalamia
- Kirknie
- Maidavale
- Majors Creek
- McDesme
- Millaroo
- Mona Park
- Mount Kelly
- Mount Surround
- Mulgrave
- Osborne
- Parkside
- Rangemore
- Rita Island
- Shirbourne
- Swans Lagoon
- Upper Haughton
- Wangaratta
- Wunjunga

== Demographics ==
| Year | Population | Notes |
|---|---|---|
| 1933 | 12,073 | |
| 1947 | 12,462 | |
| 1954 | 15,208 | |
| 1961 | 16,758 | |
| 1966 | 18,693 | |
| 1971 | 17,443 | |
| 1976 | 18,421 | |
| 1981 | 18,477 | |
| 1986 | 18,337 | |
| 1991 | 18,148 | |
| 1996 | 18,870 | |
| 2001 census | 18,234 | |
| 2006 census | 17,020 | |
| 2011 census | 17,364 | |
| 2016 census | 17,074 | |
| 2021 census | 16,692 | |

In the 2021 census, the Burdekin Shire had a population of 16,692 people. 37.0% described their ancestry as Australian. This is followed by 34.5% who described their ancestry as English, then Italian (17.2%), Scottish (10.6%) and Irish at 10.2%. 84.7% spoke only English at home followed by the next most common languages: 2.0% Italian, 0.3% Afrikaans, 0.3% Greek, 0.3% Vietnamese and 0.3% Pidgin. Indigenous Australians were listed as making up 6.6% of the Burdekin population.

== Council ==
Burdekin Shire Council

Type
- Type: Unicameral

Leadership
- Mayor: Pierina Dalle Cort, Independent
- Deputy Mayor: Max Musumeci, Independent

Structure
- Seats: 7 elected representatives, including a Mayor and 6 councillors
- Political groups: Majority: Independent (6); Minority: Liberal National (1)

Elections
- Last election: 16 March 2024
- Next election: 25 March 2028

Below is the current council, elected in 2024:

| Councillor | Party | Notes |
|---|---|---|
| Pierina Dalle Cort | Independent | Mayor |
| Max Musumeci | Independent | Deputy Mayor |
| Michael Detenon | Independent | |
| John Furnell | Independent | |
| Amanda Hall | Liberal National | |
| Callan Oar | Independent | |
| Delfine Vasta | Independent | |

== Chairmen and mayors ==
| Dates | Chairman / Mayors | Notes |
|---|---|---|
| 1896 | James Henry Rae | |
| 1888 | Charles Young | |
| 1896 | J. H. Rae | |
| 1927 | Herbert Barsby | |
| 1952–1970 | E.W. Ford | |
| 1970–1976 | R. W. Rossiter | |
| 1976–1982 | F.J. Mills | |
| 1982–1991 | J.W. Trace | |
| 1991–1994 | E.N. Honeycombe | |
| 1994–2004 | John F. Woods | First to use the title "Mayor" |
| 2004–2012 | Lynette Angela (Lyn) McLaughlin | |
| 2012–2016 | William Charles (Bill) Lowis | |
| 2016–2024 | Lynette Angela (Lyn) McLaughlin | |
| 2024-present | Pierina Dalle Cort | |
