= Ayr State High School =

Secondary school in the Shire of Burdekin, Queensland, Australia

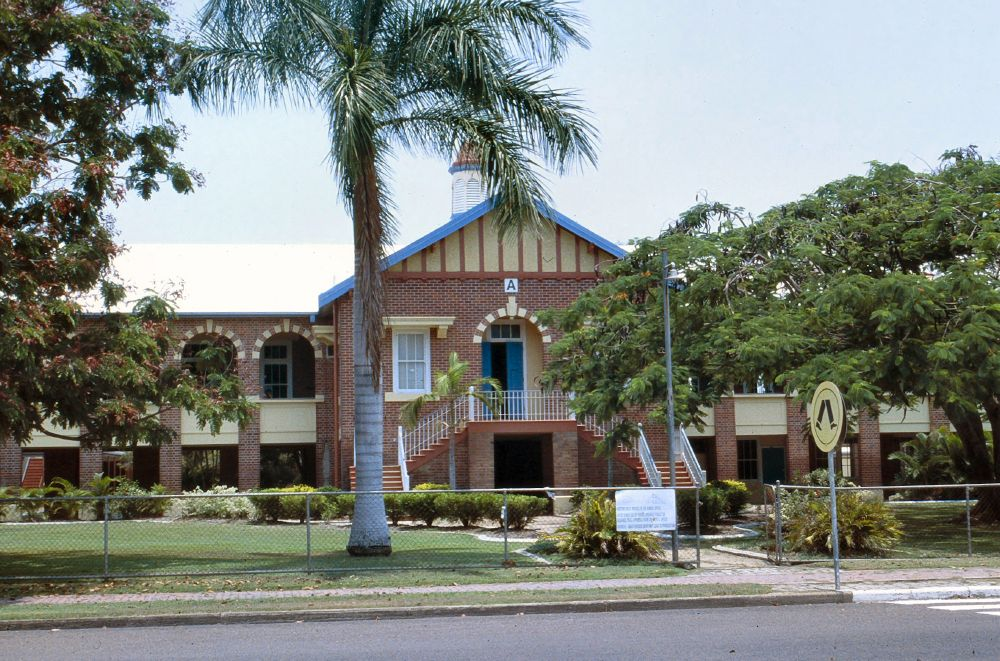
- Heritage-listed building at Ayr State High School

Location
- Edwards St; Ayr, Queensland, 4807; Australia

Information
- Type: State, co-ed, secondary
- Motto: Meliora Sequimur
- Established: 1937
- Principal: Craig Whittred
- Staff: 71
- Grades: 7–12
- Enrolment: 480 (2017)
- Houses: Banks, Maquarie, Phillip and Cook
- Website: ayrshs.eq.edu.au

Ayr State High School
- Location within Queensland
- 19.5771°S 147.409°E
- Location: 82–90 Wickham Street, Ayr, Shire of Burdekin, Queensland, Australia

History
- Design period: 1919–1930s (interwar period)
- Built: 1935–1937

Site notes
- Architect: Department of Public Works (Queensland)
- Architectural style: Classicism

Queensland Heritage Register
- Official name: Ayr State High School, Ayr State High and Intermediate School
- Type: state heritage (built)
- Designated: 13 January 1995
- Reference no.: 601574
- Significant period: 1930s (historical); 1930s (fabric); 1935–ongoing (social)
- Significant components: flagpole/flagstaff, roof/ridge ventilator/s / fleche/s, school/school room

Ayr State High School is a heritage-listed state secondary school at 82–90 Wickham Street, Ayr, Shire of Burdekin, Queensland, Australia. It is one of three high schools in Ayr, the others being Burdekin Catholic High School and Burdekin Christian College. Ayr State High School was designed by Department of Public Works (Queensland) and built from 1935 to 1937. It was also known as Ayr State High and Intermediate School. It was added to the Queensland Heritage Register on 13 January 1995.

== Facilities ==
The school has eleven buildings, including a fifty-seat auditorium and a multi-purpose shelter with a capacity of well over seven hundred for the school's 500 students.

== Notable alumni ==
- Karrie Webb – Former World Number 1 in Women's Golf

== History ==
The earliest building at Ayr State High School was erected in 1934–36 as the Ayr State High and Intermediate School, with an enrolment drawn from the wider Burdekin region. It was constructed during a period of unprecedented economic growth in Ayr, and ranks with the 1935 Court House, 1935 Masonic Hall and 1939 Tropix Theatre, as one of the more important interwar buildings in the town.

The Burdekin was first settled in the 1860s, and the town of Ayr was surveyed in 1882. The town grew in support of the increasing number of sugar plantations and small sugar growers establishing themselves in the Burdekin River region, and by the 1920s was the principal town in the district.

A primary school was established at Ayr in 1886, but until the late 1920s Burdekin children had no local access to secondary education. In 1913 the Ayr State School committee requested the provision of high school courses at the primary school, and in 1920 promoted the idea of a separate high school for Ayr. A secondary department, offering academic, commercial, domestic science and manual training subjects, was finally attached to Ayr State School in 1928.

In the early 1930s the local state school committee, encouraged by Ayr's unprecedented interwar growth and prosperity as a result of the expansion of the sugar industry, continued to put pressure on the Department of Public Instruction for the establishment of a high school. When the Department finally acquiesced, however, it was for a combined high and intermediate school, and there is some indication that an intermediate school only was considered at first. In fact, from 1925 until the late 1930s, Ayr State High School was the only new high school in the state, although several new secondary departments were established.

Intermediate schools, equipped with workshops, laboratories, and domestic science rooms, were established in principal Queensland towns after 1928. They reflected a fundamental change in Queensland education policy in the late 1920s, focussing on syllabus revision and the education of children over 11 years of age. In Brisbane, intermediate schools were established as separate institutions, but in country areas, they generally formed part of existing high schools. Intermediate schools catered for children 12–13 years of age, offering a two-year course as a link between primary and secondary education. Setting up new schools for a two-year course proved expensive, and the intermediate school concept was replaced in the 1940s and 1950s by multilateral high schools offering a variety of courses.

Plans for the Ayr Intermediate School (which opened as the Ayr State High and Intermediate School) were prepared in the Queensland Government Architect's office of the Department of Public Works in late 1934. The Chief Architect at this time was Andrew Baxter Leven (1885–1966). Leven was born, educated and worked as an Inspector of Works in Scotland before migrating to Australia. From 1910 to 1951 he was employed by the Queensland Government Works Department and was Chief Architect and Quantity Surveyor from 1933 to 1951. Other members of the office involved in the design were Frederick Thomas Jellett and Harold James Parr.

During the 1930s Depression a government initiated works scheme was established to create employment. This involved the employment of architects, foremen and day labourers, and the use of local materials in the design and construction of government buildings such as court houses, government offices and state schools. This scheme, under which the Ayr State High and Intermediate School was constructed, was instigated by Labor Premier Forgan Smith.

A site on the southern side of the town, a former Showground Reserve which was set aside as a high school reserve in 1921, was selected for the new high and intermediate school. The two-storeyed brick building was in progress by mid-1935, and was opened on 1 March 1937 with an enrolment of 77 students in the high school and 203 in the intermediate section. Construction had cost approximately £16,000, and when completed provided for a manual training section, store rooms, and a large concreted play area on the ground floor, and 8 classrooms, head teacher's office, staffrooms, entrance hall, cloakrooms, and domestic science section on the first floor.

The intermediate section ceased as such at the end of 1963, and since 1964 the school has functioned as the Ayr State High School.

== Description ==
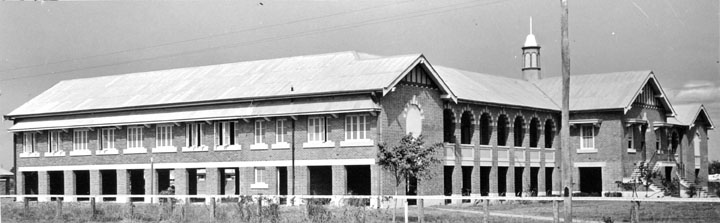
Additional wing, Ayr Intermediate School, August 1940

Ayr State High School is an elevated brick school building with a corrugated iron roof which is topped with a ventilator and flagpole. The central entrance projects forward and on either side the classroom wings are connected by verandahs. The wings are one classroom wide so as to provide cross ventilation. The verandahs have arched arcading, which forms open play areas underneath. The detailing around arches is highlighted with stucco.

The grounds include large expanses of lawn and substantial shade trees.

== Heritage listing ==
Ayr State High School was listed on the Queensland Heritage Register on 13 January 1995 having satisfied the following criteria.

The place is important in demonstrating the evolution or pattern of Queensland's history.

Ayr State High School, erected in 1934–36, is significant as one of a group of substantial interwar buildings in Ayr, which illustrate the unprecedented era of prosperity accompanying the expansion of the sugar industry in the Burdekin region. The building also reflects the State Government's commitment to Ayr as a major regional centre in the interwar years.

Ayr State High School is evidence of the implementation of the Intermediate School system, experimented with by the Queensland Department of Public Instruction during the interwar years.

The place is important in demonstrating the principal characteristics of a particular class of cultural places.

Ayr State High School is significant as an excellent regional example of a school building following the tradition of fine buildings erected by the Queensland Public Works Department. The use of brick and restrained classical detailing is typical for government buildings of the period.

It is also a good example of a building designed to accommodate the tropical North Queensland climate, being raised above an open undercroft; with wide verandahs and ventilators.

The place is important because of its aesthetic significance.

Ayr State High School is significant for its aesthetic quality in design and classical-inspired detailing, including the arched entrance and symmetrical layout with projecting central bay.
