= Ayr, Queensland =

Town in Queensland, Australia

Ayr
- Town
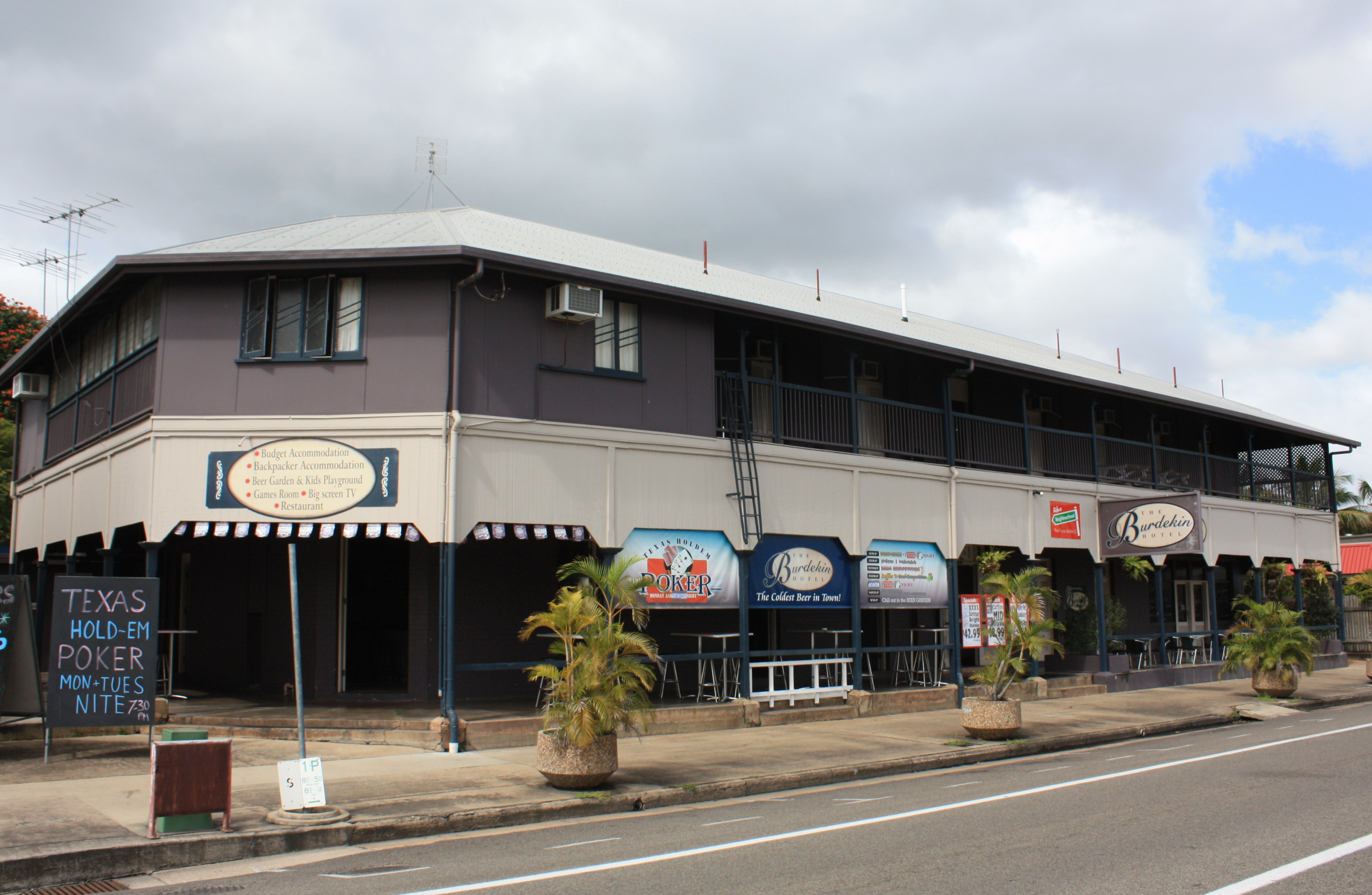
- Burdekin Hotel, Ayr, 2010

- Interactive map of Ayr
- Coordinates: 19.5744°S 147.4066°E
- Country: Australia
- State: Queensland
- LGA: Shire of Burdekin
- Location: 88.2 km (54.8 mi) SE of Townsville; 302 km (188 mi) NW of Mackay; 1,247 km (775 mi) NNW of Brisbane
- Established: 1882

Government
  - State electorate: Burdekin
  - Federal division: Dawson

Area
  - Total: 29.1 km^{2} (11.2 sq mi)
- Elevation: 12.0 m (39.4 ft)

Population
  - Total: 8,603 (2021 census)
  - Density: 295.6/km^{2} (765.7/sq mi)
- Time zone: UTC+10:00 (AEST)
- Postcode: 4807
- Mean max temp: 29.5 °C (85.1 °F)
- Mean min temp: 18.4 °C (65.1 °F)
- Annual rainfall: 866.8 mm (34.13 in)
Localities around Ayr
Brandon	Alva	Airdmillan
Brandon	Ayr	Airdmillan
Brandon	McDesme	Jarvisfield

Ayr is a rural town and locality in the Shire of Burdekin, Queensland, Australia. It is the centre of a sugarcane-growing region and the administrative centre for the Burdekin Shire Council. In the 2021 census, the locality of Ayr had a population of 8,603 people.

== History ==
=== Aboriginal history ===
Biri (Birri) is a language of Central and North Queensland. Biri refers to a language chain extending from Central Queensland towards Townsville and is often used as a universal name for other languages and/or dialects across the region. The language area includes the towns of Bowen, Ayr, Collinsville and Nebo.

=== British exploration ===
The first British exploration of the area occurred in 1839 during the third voyage of HMS Beagle where Captain John Clements Wickham travelled 10 miles up the waterway later known as the Burdekin River. His progress was stopped by a fishing weir built by the local Aboriginal people that spanned the river.

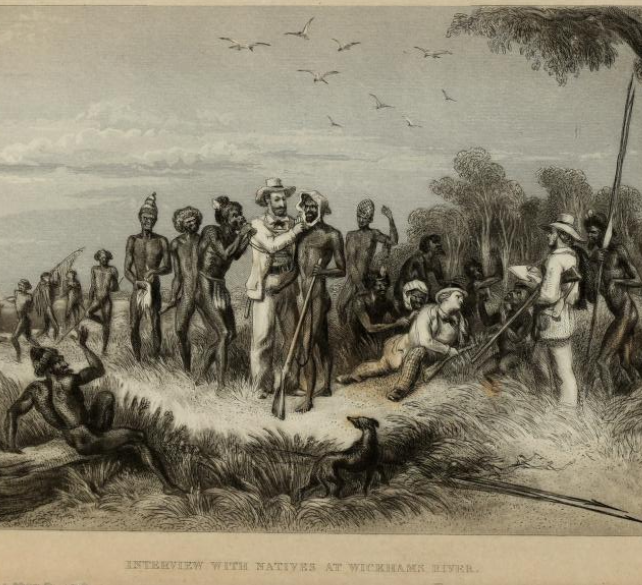
Interview with Natives of Wickham (Burdekin) River by H.S. Melville

In 1843, during the surveying voyage of HMS Fly, Lieutenant John Ince, Joseph Jukes and Frederick Evans sailed up the river near to where the town of Ayr is now located. They encountered two large tribes of Aboriginal people with whom they had friendly interactions, exchanging items and participating in an apparent Welcome to Country ceremony. Artist, Harden Sidney Melville was also present, later drawing a depiction of the meeting.

Shipwreck survivor James Morrill lived with Aboriginal people in the region for seventeen years from 1846 when he was washed ashore on a makeshift raft. Morrill lived a traditional Aboriginal lifestyle and later made a culturally and historically important record of his experiences.

In 1859, Henry Daniel Sinclair, James Gordon and Ben Poole conducted a sea voyage that examined the mouth of the Burdekin River. They travelled about 8 miles up the river but were afraid to explore further as they were wary of the resident Aborigines and had limited firearms.

George Elphinstone Dalrymple led an overland expedition to the area in 1859 looking for land acquisitions and he returned again in 1860 as the head of a seagoing exploratory party. Dalrymple had several violent encounters with the local Aboriginal people during these expeditions. In 1862, Dalrymple made another journey to the lower Burdekin region concluding that the "richly grassed open forest country" would become "a most valuable addition to the pastoral and agricultural resources of the colony."

=== British colonisation ===
The area was opened up to pastoral squatting leases in 1861 and in that year Edward Spencer Antill (who was a son of the distinguished colonist Henry Colden Antill) arrived in the region to take up land. In 1862, he selected a large area of land along the lower Burdekin River for a sheep station which he named Jarvisfield after the Antill family estate near Picton. Groups of armed settlers and Native Police started to force the Aboriginal people off the land around this time, with James Morrill documenting a massacre of a resident Burdekin River tribe. E.S. Antill bore a life-long scar on his forehead from a boomerang thrown at him during one of these episodes of frontier violence. Morrill attempted to negotiate a treaty between the British and the Aborigines whereby the coastal area on the north side of the Burdekin would be a reserve for the Indigenous people but this was ignored by the authorities.

After E.S. Antill had become established, other colonists took up land in the region, namely John Graham MacDonald who formed the Inkerman Downs property with the financial backing of Robert Towns, and Edward Cunningham who formed Woodhouse station. In retribution for murders and cattle spearing, punitive expeditions by the Native Police led by Lieutenant John Marlow would "disperse" the local Aboriginal population.

A township, named Wickham, was formed in the region in 1864 but was destroyed in 1870 during a flood. Robert William Graham formed the Lilliesmere run in 1876 and in 1881 the township of Ayr was laid out on this property by surveyor Ellis William Lymburner.

Ayr was named after the Scottish town of Ayr, the birthplace of nineteenth-century Queensland Premier, Sir Thomas McIlwraith.

Ayr Post Office opened on 25 August 1883.

=== Sugarcane plantations and mills ===
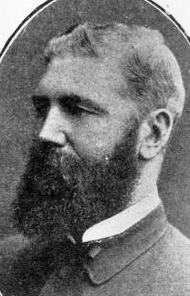
Archibald Campbell MacMillan

Large scale cultivation of sugarcane began in the region in 1879 with the formation of the Burdekin Delta Sugar Company through the partnership of local landholders Robert William Graham and Archibald Campbell MacMillan. Their plantation was called Airdmillan and in 1883 the Airdmillan sugar mill was built. Both the mill and the plantation became financially unviable in 1885 after the repatriation of kidnapped South Sea Islander labourers working on the plantation. Of the 532 Islanders brought to Airdmillan, 128 or 24% had died by 1885. In the 1890s, Airdmillan was subdivided and today much of the town of Ayr is located on what was once part of the Airdmillan estate. The nearby locality of Airdmillan is named after the plantation.

Other colonists also established plantations and mills in the region during the 1880s. James Mackenzie formed the Seaforth estate and mill, while Colin Munro built the Drynie mill. In 1882, John Spiller and Henry Brandon established the Pioneer plantation which was soon sold to the Drysdale brothers. The Drysdales built the Pioneer Mill in 1884 and later constructed the Inkerman Mill in 1914. Charles and John Young formed the Kalamia plantation in 1882, the Kalamia Mill being operational two years later. Much of the labour on these plantations during the early years was performed by South Sea Islanders, many of whom died in the first year after being shipped in. At Kalamia and Pioneer, the death rate was 14%, and at Seaforth it was 26%. Islander labour in the region was discontinued in the early 1900s.

The Pioneer, Kalamia and Inkerman mills are still operational and are owned by Wilmar Sugar.

=== Schools ===
Ayr State School opened on 15 November 1886. In 1928 it was expanded to include a secondary school. In 1937, the secondary school became a separate entity, Ayr State High School.

St Francis Primary School opened in 1912 operated by three Sisters of the Good Samaritan.

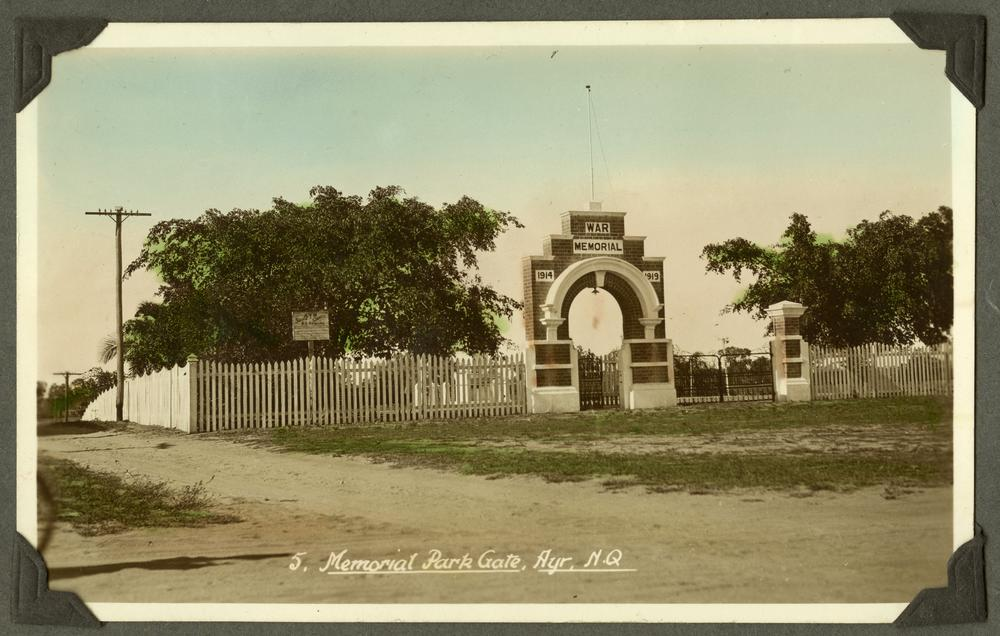
War Memorial Park arch over the gate at the Memorial Park, 1937-1938

The Ayr War Memorial Arch is the entrance to the Memorial Park and commemorates those who served in World War I. It was dedicated in November 1925 by the shire chairman, Councillor Barsby.

In 1926 Annie Dennis founded the Burdekin Community Church as a Pentecostal mission for South Sea Islanders.

East Ayr State School opened on 8 August 1952.

Ayr Opportunity School opened for children with disabilities in 1972. It was renamed Burdekin Special School in about 1985. In 2001 the name was changed to Burdekin School.

Burdekin Catholic High School opened on 1 April 1974 in the Marist tradition.

Burdekin Christian College was opened on 5 February 1982 by the Burdekin Community Church.

Burdekin Library opened in 1984.

In June 2018, the town become the centre of controversy when a racist poster was displayed in a shop window, asserting that foreigners and backpackers were not welcome. Within hours, Burdekin Shire Council Mayor Lyn McLaughlin condemned the people responsible for the poster.

== Geography ==
Ayr is located 88 kilometres (55 mi) south of Townsville on the Bruce Highway and 12 kilometres (7.5 mi) away from the (smaller) town of Home Hill. It is 112 kilometres (70 mi) north of Bowen and 290 kilometres (180 mi) north of Mackay. Ayr is located near the delta of the Burdekin River. It is within the Burdekin Shire, which produces the most sugar cane per square kilometre in Australia, accessing underground water supplies and water from the Burdekin Dam to irrigate crops when rains fail.

Mirrigan is a neighbourhood within the locality (19.6°S 147.4°E). It takes its name from the former Mirrigan railway station (19.5943°S 147.3960°E) which was assigned by the Queensland Railways Department on 10 September 1914. It is an Aboriginal name meaning star.

Parkside is a neighbourhood within the south-east of the town (19.5833°S 147.4166°E).

Ayr railway station (19.5744°S 147.3961°E) is on the North Coast railway line and is a passenger stop for the Spirit of Queensland.

Kalamia Sidings railway siding point is on the Kalamia Sugar Mill's cane tramway (19.5710°S 147.3932°E).

=== Climate ===
Ayr experiences a tropical savannah climate (Koppen: Aw), with a short wet season from December to April and a long dry season from May to November. The average annual rainfall is 943.9 millimetres (37.16 in), primarily concentrated in the austral summer. Extreme temperatures in Ayr have ranged from 1.4 °C (34.5 °F) on 2 July 1984 to 44.0 °C (111.2 °F) on 7 January 1994.

Climate data for Ayr (19º37'12"S, 147º22'48"E, 17 m AMSL) (1951–2024 normals and extremes)
Month	Jan	Feb	Mar	Apr	May	Jun	Jul	Aug	Sep	Oct	Nov	Dec	Year
Record high °C (°F)	44.0 (111.2)	40.6 (105.1)	37.2 (99.0)	36.0 (96.8)	33.2 (91.8)	32.2 (90.0)	32.5 (90.5)	34.1 (93.4)	36.5 (97.7)	38.0 (100.4)	41.9 (107.4)	42.5 (108.5)	44.0 (111.2)
Mean daily maximum °C (°F)	31.8 (89.2)	31.6 (88.9)	31.0 (87.8)	29.6 (85.3)	27.6 (81.7)	25.5 (77.9)	25.2 (77.4)	26.3 (79.3)	28.2 (82.8)	30.0 (86.0)	31.2 (88.2)	32.1 (89.8)	29.2 (84.5)
Mean daily minimum °C (°F)	22.8 (73.0)	22.8 (73.0)	21.6 (70.9)	19.1 (66.4)	16.2 (61.2)	13.0 (55.4)	11.9 (53.4)	12.7 (54.9)	15.2 (59.4)	18.2 (64.8)	20.7 (69.3)	22.1 (71.8)	18.0 (64.5)
Record low °C (°F)	17.4 (63.3)	16.7 (62.1)	11.9 (53.4)	8.5 (47.3)	3.7 (38.7)	2.2 (36.0)	1.4 (34.5)	2.0 (35.6)	5.6 (42.1)	7.7 (45.9)	11.5 (52.7)	12.5 (54.5)	1.4 (34.5)
Average precipitation mm (inches)	230.5 (9.07)	231.0 (9.09)	149.0 (5.87)	52.3 (2.06)	41.1 (1.62)	23.3 (0.92)	17.9 (0.70)	15.4 (0.61)	9.7 (0.38)	26.4 (1.04)	45.2 (1.78)	99.7 (3.93)	943.9 (37.16)
Average precipitation days (≥ 1.0 mm)	9.6	10.3	7.8	3.6	3.1	2.3	1.7	1.6	1.2	2.2	4.0	5.7	53.1
Average afternoon relative humidity (%)	64	68	61	59	54	54	47	47	49	53	57	58	56
Average dew point °C (°F)	22.6 (72.7)	23.1 (73.6)	21.5 (70.7)	19.3 (66.7)	16.1 (61.0)	13.9 (57.0)	11.5 (52.7)	12.2 (54.0)	14.7 (58.5)	17.5 (63.5)	19.6 (67.3)	21.3 (70.3)	17.8 (64.0)
Mean monthly sunshine hours	251.1	203.4	229.4	234.0	229.4	231.0	257.3	269.7	276.0	291.4	273.0	275.9	3,021.6
Percentage possible sunshine	62	56	61	67	66	70	75	76	77	75	70	67	69
Source: Bureau of Meteorology (1951–2024 normals and extremes)

== Demographics ==
In the 2016 census, the locality of Ayr had a population of 8,738 people. Aboriginal and Torres Strait Islander people made up 7.7% of the population. 82.4% of people were born in Australia. The next most common country of birth was Italy at 2.1%. 85.4% of people only spoke English at home. Other languages spoken at home included Italian at 2.8%. The most common responses for religion were Catholic 37.3%, Anglican 15.7% and No Religion 15.0%.

In the 2021 census, the locality of Ayr had a population of 8,987 people. Aboriginal and Torres Strait Islander people made up 7.9% of the population. 80% of people were born in Australia. The next most common country of birth was Italy at 1.7%. 83.4% of people only spoke English at home. Other languages spoken at home included Italian at 2.1%. The most common responses for religion were Catholic 33.7%, No religion 22.4% and Anglican 13%.

== Heritage listings ==
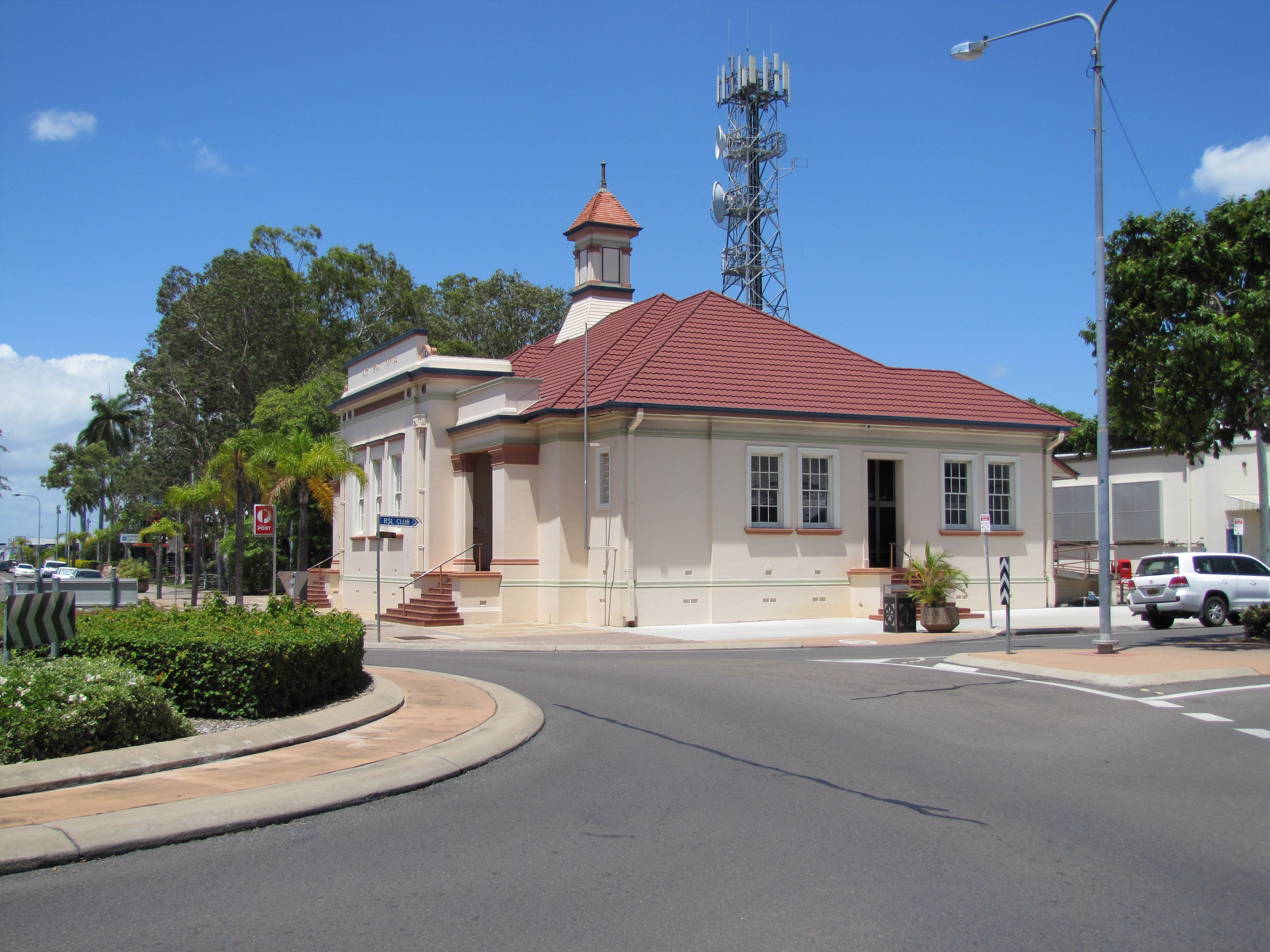
Ayr Post Office, 2014

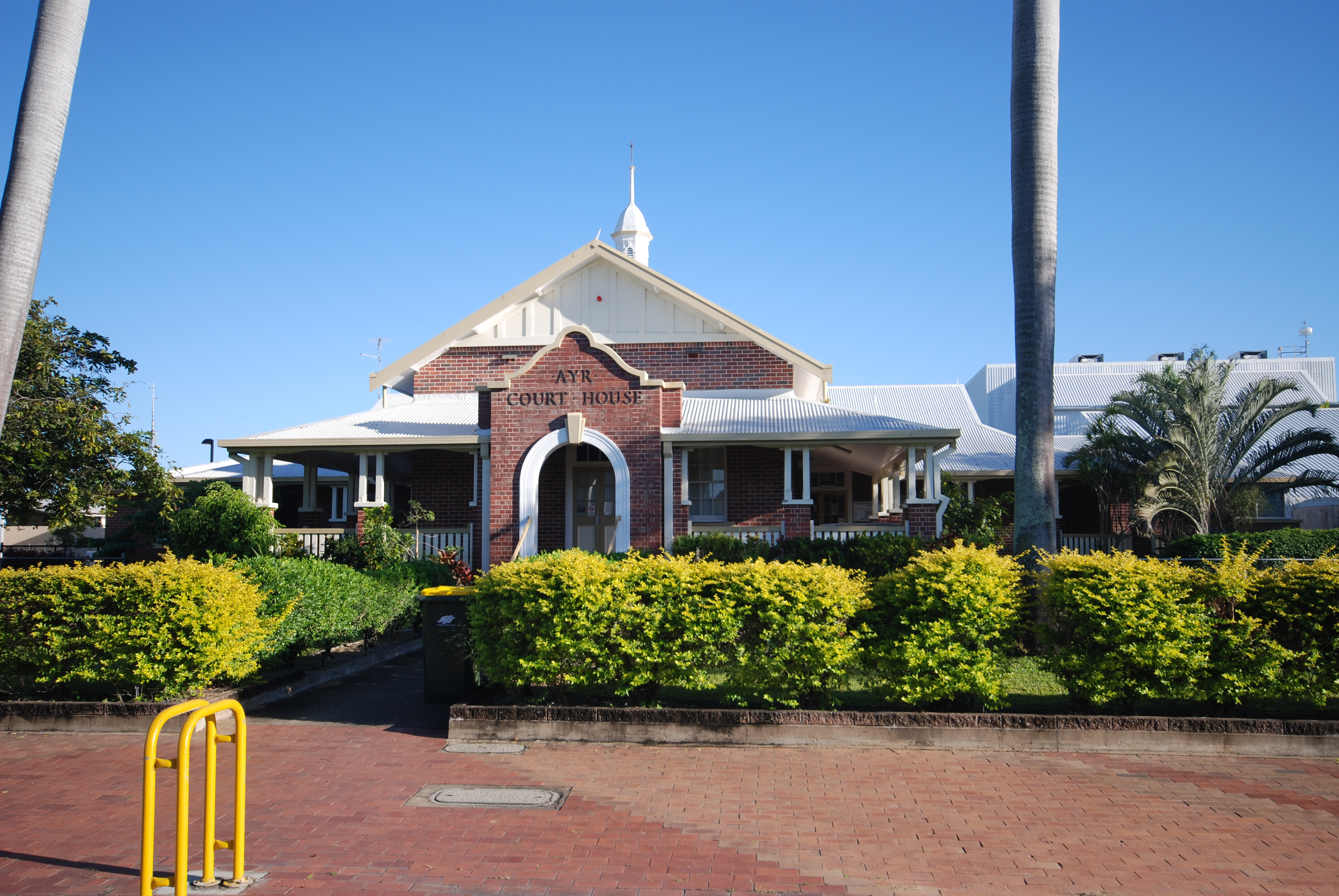
Ayr Court House, 2009

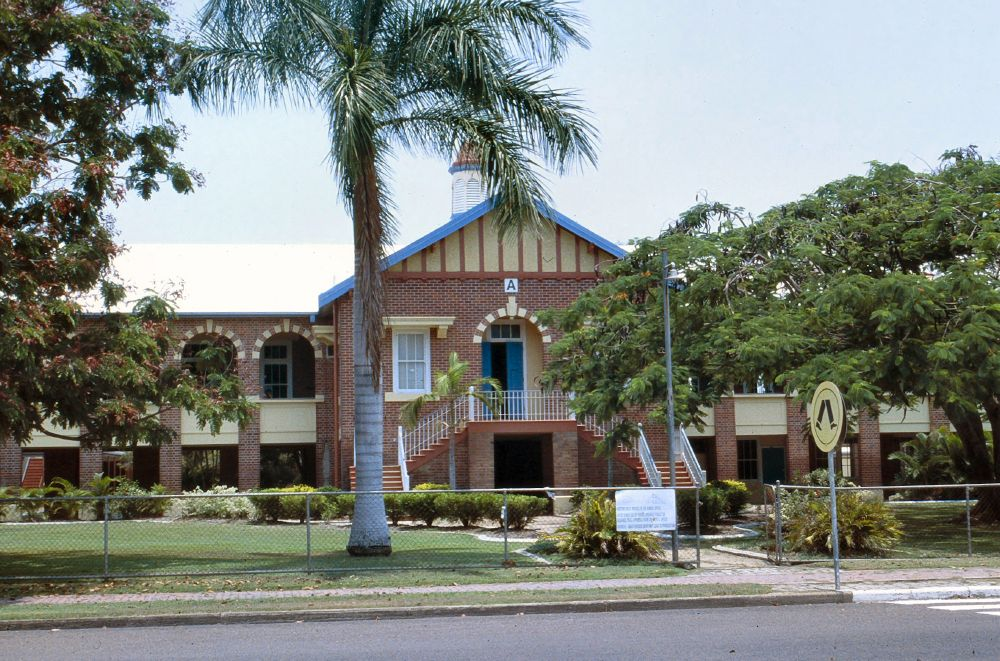
Ayr State High School

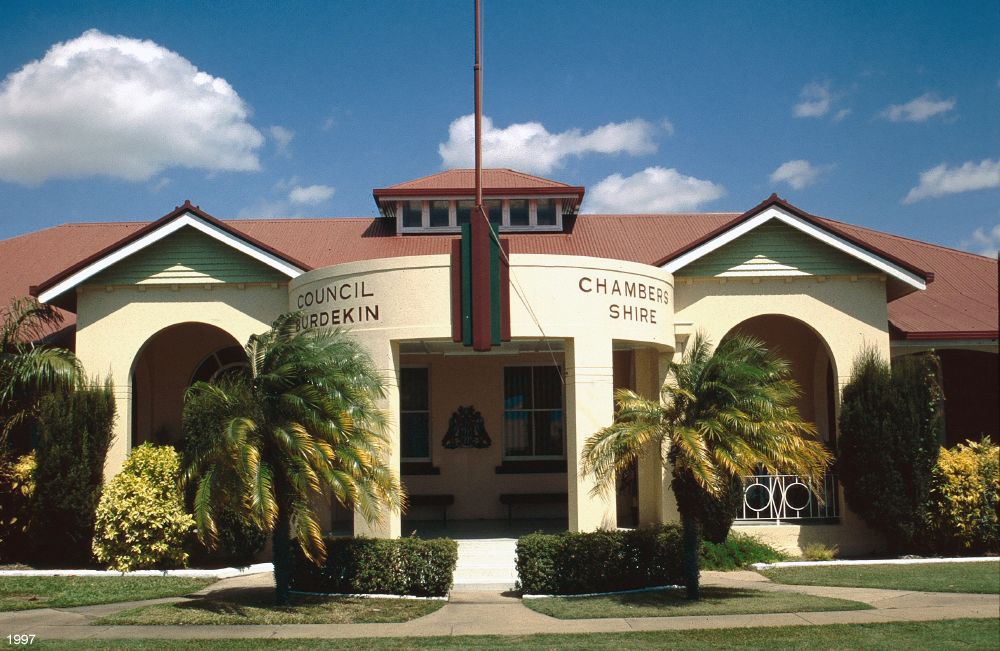
Burdekin Shire Council Chambers

Ayr has a number of heritage-listed sites, including:

- Ayr Post Office, 155 Queen Street
- Ayr Court House, 163 Queen Street
- Ayr Masonic Temple, 118–120 Macmillan Street (19.5784°S 147.4052°E):
- Ayr State High School 82–90 Wickham Street
- Burdekin Shire Council Chambers, 145 Young Street

== Education ==
Ayr State School is a government primary (Preparatory to Year 6) school for boys and girls at 141 Graham Street (19.5790°S 147.4005°E). In 2017, the school had an enrolment of 119 students with 14 teachers (11 full-time equivalent) and 17 non-teaching staff (10 full-time equivalent).

East Ayr State School is a government primary (Preparatory to Year 6) school for boys and girls at 43–73 Ross Street (19.5634°S 147.4164°E). In 2017, the school had an enrolment of 557 students with 47 teachers (40 full-time equivalent) and 22 non-teaching staff (15 full-time equivalent). It includes a special education program.

St Francis' School is a Catholic primary (Preparatory to Year 6) school for boys and girls at 99 Edward Street (19.5704°S 147.4014°E). In 2017, the school had an enrolment of 304 students with 20 teachers (17 full-time equivalent) and 17 non-teaching staff (11 full-time equivalent).

Burdekin Christian College is a private primary and secondary (Preparatory to Year 12) school for boys and girls at 2–12 Melbourne Street (19.5729°S 147.4170°E). In 2017, the school had an enrolment of 133 students with 13 teachers (12 full-time equivalent) and 10 non-teaching staff (8 full-time equivalent).

Burdekin School is a special primary and secondary (Early Childhood to Year 12) school for boys and girls at 159 Young Street (19.5784°S 147.4079°E). In 2017, the school had an enrolment of 17 students with 5 teachers (4 full-time equivalent) and 11 non-teaching staff (6 full-time equivalent).

Ayr State High School is a government secondary (7 to 12) school for boys and girls at Cnr Edwards and Wickham Streets (19.5770°S 147.4096°E). In 2017, the school had an enrolment of 480 students with 46 teachers (44 full-time equivalent) and 30 non-teaching staff (23 full-time equivalent). It has a special education program.

Burdekin Catholic High School is a Catholic secondary (7 to 12) school for boys and girls at 45 Gibson Street (19.5646°S 147.4145°E). In 2017, the school had an enrolment of 436 students with 40 teachers (39 full-time equivalent) and 23 non-teaching staff (19 full-time equivalent).

== Facilities ==
Ayr is home to a small, state owned hospital. The one-storey building offers basic emergency care and has a helipad for more-serious emergencies.

== Amenities ==
Ayr has range of shops and banks.

The Burdekin Shire Council operates a public library in Ayr at 108 Graham Street (19.5759°S 147.4039°E).

The Ayr branch of the Queensland Country Women's Association meets at 20 Chippendale Street.

Burdekin Uniting Church has two churches, one at 130 Mackenzie Street (19.5764°S 147.4028°E) in Ayr and the other in Home Hill.

== Sport ==
A wide variety of sports are played in Ayr, including touch football, rugby league, rugby union, soccer, tennis and golf. Netball and table tennis (ping pong) are also popular. The Ayr Surf Life Saving club is small and well-established.

Pioneer Park Speedway is a motorcycle speedway venue to the west of the town on Bruce Highway. The track has been a significant venue for important speedway events, including qualifying rounds of the Speedway World Championship and the final of the Australian Solo Championship.

== Attractions ==
Alva Beach, also known as Lynch's Beach, is a popular area for fishing and swimming located 16 kilometres (9.9 mi) east of Ayr.

== Media ==
Published every Thursday, Burdekin Life is the region's only independent newspaper distributed across the Burdekin region as well as Bowen and the Townsville CBD.

== Transport ==
Ayr's main street, Queen Street, is a wide two-laned street. The Bruce Highway passes through the town. A mostly two-laned highway, it is the major road of the Burdekin, linking Ayr with nearby Brandon and Home Hill.

Ayr Railway Station is the town's rail-transit stop with regular services from Brisbane to Cairns. While the town has no public transport, several bus routes pick up school children across the region.

The nearest airport is Townsville Airport, located 90 km (56 mi) north west of Ayr.

== Notable people ==
- Mark Allison: business executive
- Zachary Anderson: football player – Central Coast Mariners
- Tom Barton: politician
- Lt Col Jim Bourke: soldier, decorated Vietnam veteran
- George Brabon: cricketer
- Tarin Bradford: rugby league player
- Nathan Burgers: field hockey player
- Patricia Cockrem: former Australian basketball player
- Mark Dalle Cort: rugby league player
- Mitchell Davey: motorcycle speedway rider
- Matthew Ham: football player – North Queensland Fury
- Jackie Huggins: Aboriginal author and historian
- Bob King: politician
- Vicky Kippin: politician
- Jeff Knuth: politician
- Peter Lawlor: politician
- Michael Macklin: politician
- Andrea McDonnell: Paralympic table tennis player
- Andrew Meads: rugby league player
- Shane Muspratt: rugby league player
- Johnny Nicol: jazz singer
- Barry O'Rourke: politician
- Kel O'Shea: Australian representative rugby league player
- Ryan Phelan: journalist and television presenter
- Patricia Taylor: Australian-born Canadian microbiologist and virologist, best known for her efforts in the Iranian hostage crisis.
- Heath Tessmann: rugby union player
- Don Walker: musician/songwriter – Cold Chisel
- Karrie Webb: professional golfer, member of LPGA Hall of Fame
- Ray Wilkie: meteorologist

== See also ==
- SS Gothenburg which was wrecked off the coast of Ayr
