= Dalbeg, Queensland =

Dalbeg
- Town
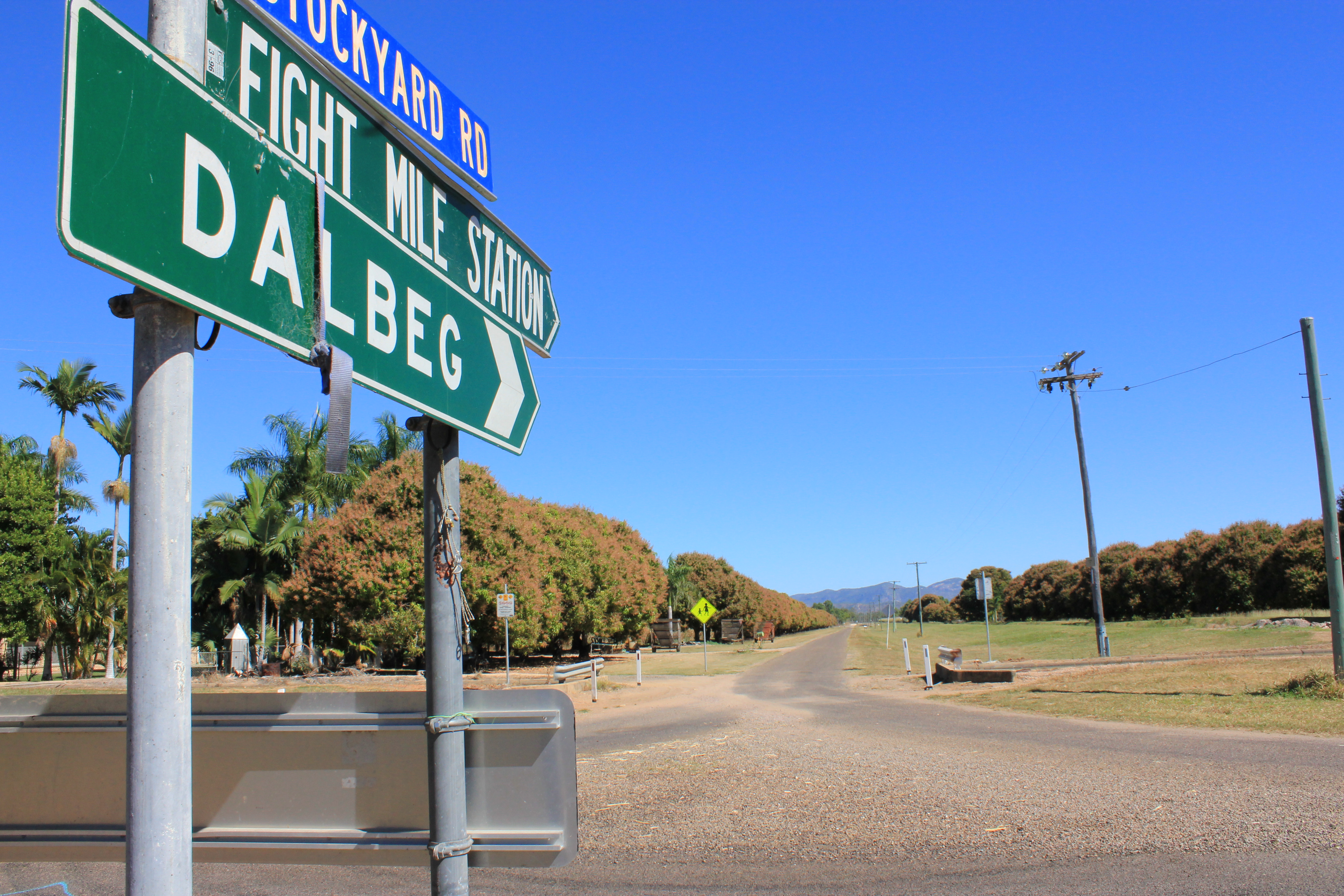
- Road signs to Dalberg, 2010

- Interactive map of Dalbeg
- Coordinates: 20.2701°S 147.2958°E
- Country: Australia
- State: Queensland
- LGA: Shire of Burdekin
- Location: 93.5 km (58.1 mi) SSW of Ayr; 148 km (92 mi) SSE of Townsville; 1,327 km (825 mi) NNW of Brisbane

Government
  - State electorate: Burdekin
  - Federal divisions: Dawson; Kennedy

Area
  - Total: 40.1 km^{2} (15.5 sq mi)

Population
  - Total: 32 (2021 census)
  - Density: 0.798/km^{2} (2.07/sq mi)
- Time zone: UTC+10:00 (AEST)
- Postcode: 4807
Localities around Dalbeg
Swans Lagoon	Millaroo	Bogie
Eight Mile Creek	Dalbeg	Bogie
Eight Mile Creek	Bogie	Bogie

Dalbeg is a rural town and locality in the Shire of Burdekin, Queensland, Australia. In the 2021 census, the locality of Dalbeg had a population of 32 people.

== Geography ==
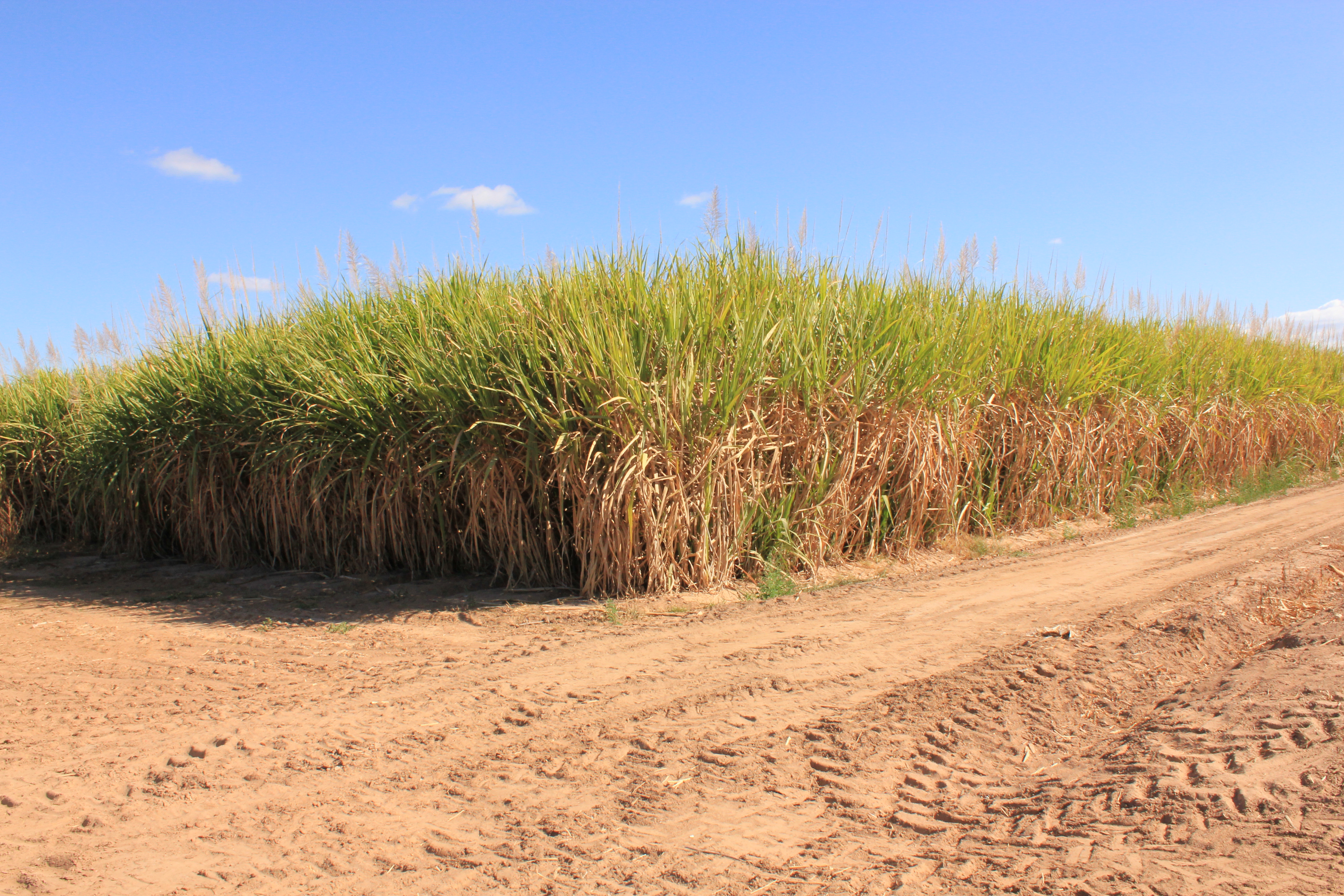
Sugarcane growing in Dalbeg, 2010

Dalbeg farming community located inland from the townships of Ayr and Home Hill. Situated on the banks of the Burdekin River, it is a fertile area famous for growing sugar cane and vegetables.

On many maps there appears to be a road crossing the Burdekin River at Dalbeg. In fact this was once a fording point. The earliest explorers coming from the Gulf region (The Plains of Promise) used Expedition Pass through the mountains to arrive at the banks of the Burdekin River at this fording point where they then crossed into Strathalbyn Station. The river can no longer be forded at this point.

== History ==
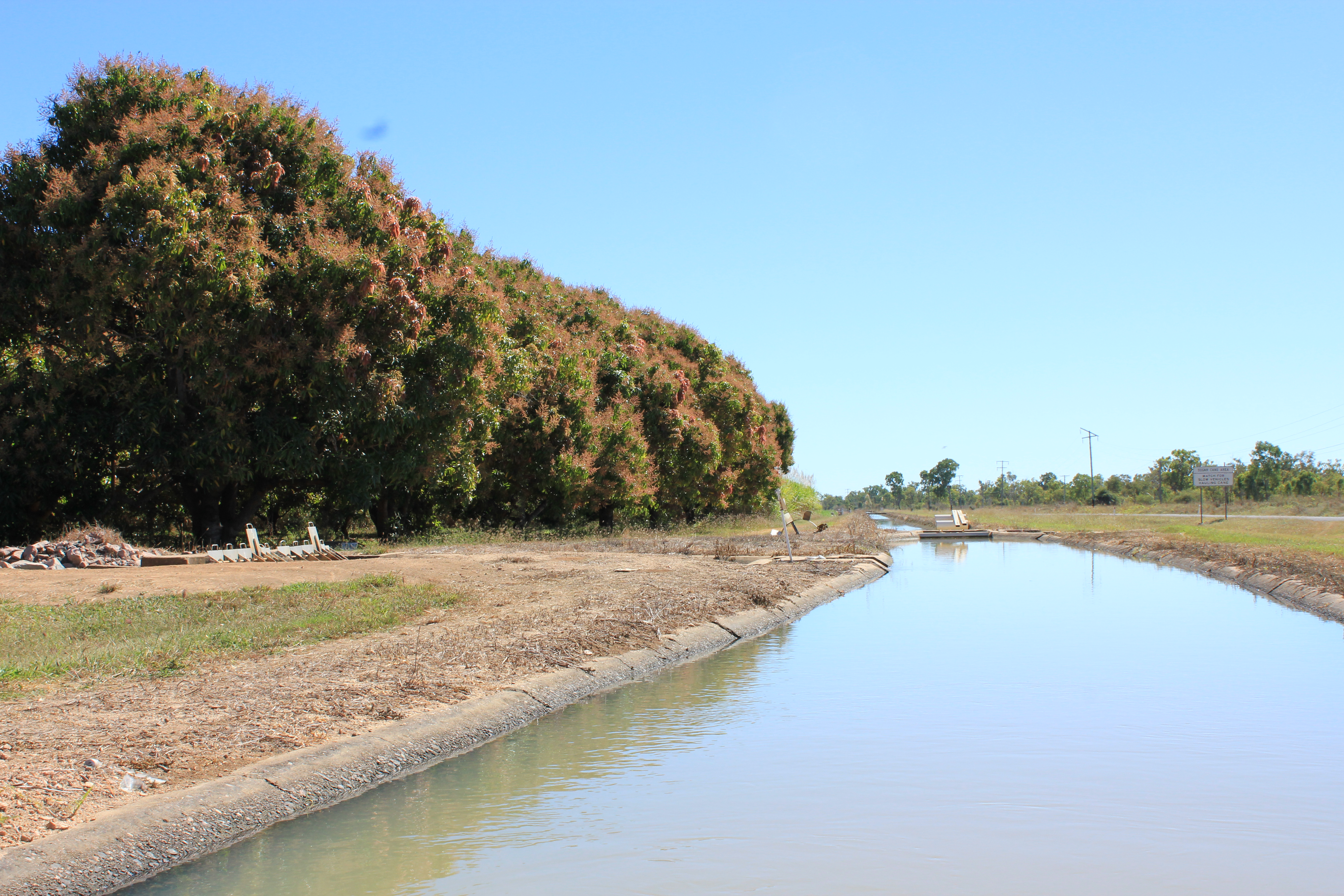
Irrigation canals, Dalbeg, 2010

The area was originally known as Akala until the Queensland Surveyor General changed the name to Dalbeg, the name of a pastoral run taken up by pastoralist James Hall Scott on 28 May 1863.

In the early 1950s, an irrigation scheme was established in Dalbeg, Millaroo and Clare to provide irrigated blocks for soldier settlers. Although the original intention was that the crops would be tobacco and rice, the settlers preferred to grow other crops, such as sugarcane, which are more water-intensive.

Dalbeg Post Office opened on 1 December 1956 and closed in 1971.

Dalbeg State School opened on 4 July 1955; it closed nn 1999. It was at 45-63 Delpratt Street (20.2708°S 147.2952°E).

Dalbeg was once home to the North Queensland Soaring Centre (then the Burdekin Soaring Club).

== Demographics ==
In the 2016 census, the locality of Dalbeg had a population of 76 people.

In the 2021 census, the locality of Dalbeg had a population of 32 people.

== Education ==
There are no schools in Dalbeg. The nearest government primary school is Millaroo State School in neighbouring Millaroo to the north. There are no government secondary schools nearby; the options are distance education or boarding school.
