= Upper Haughton, Queensland =

Upper Haughton
- Suburb
- Interactive map of Upper Haughton
- Coordinates: 19.7402°S 147.0713°E
- Country: Australia
- State: Queensland
- LGA: Shire of Burdekin
- Location: 37.3 km (23.2 mi) W of Home Hil; 39.3 km (24.4 mi) WSW of Ayr; 72 km (45 mi) SE of Townsville; 1,303 km (810 mi) NNW of Brisbane

Government
  - State electorate: Burdekin
  - Federal divisions: Dawson; Kennedy

Area
  - Total: 366.2 km^{2} (141.4 sq mi)

Population
  - Total: 34 (2021 census)
  - Density: 0.0928/km^{2} (0.240/sq mi)
- Time zone: UTC+10:00 (AEST)
- Postcode: 4809
Suburbs around Upper Haughton
Majors Creek; Woodstock	Horseshoe Lagoon	Barratta
Reid River	Upper Haughton	Mona Park
Ravenswood	Mulgrave	Clare

Upper Haughton is a rural locality in the Shire of Burdekin, Queensland, Australia. In the 2021 census, Upper Haughton had a population of 34 people.

== Geography ==
The locality is bounded to the west by the Haughton River and to the north-east by Barratta Creek.

The terrain ranges from 10 to 274 metres (33 to 899 ft) above sea level. Most of the locality is low-lying, but there are three mountains in the west of the locality:

- Clayhole Hills (19.8021°S 146.9633°E) 125 metres (410 ft)
- Horse Camp Hill (19.8406°S 146.9968°E) 249 metres (817 ft)
- Piccaninny Mountain (19.7915°S 146.9461°E) 274 metres (899 ft)

The land in the north-east of the locality is predominantly used for growing sugarcane and there is a network of cane tramways to transport the harvested sugarcane to the Invicta sugar mill in Giru to the north. The rest of the locality is predominantly used for grazing on native vegetation.

== History ==
The locality was officially named and bounded on 23 February 2001. It presumably takes its name from the Haughton River which forms its western boundary. The river in turn was originally named after stockman Richard Houghton by pastoralist and explorer James Cassady. However, it was renamed on 28 April 1950 to Haughton River at the request of the local residents and the Queensland Electoral Office.

== Demographics ==
In the 2016 census, Upper Haughton had a population of 75 people.

In the 2021 census, Upper Haughton had a population of 34 people.

== Education ==
There are no schools in Upper Haughton. The nearest government primary schools are Clare State School in neighbouring Clare to the south-east, Woodstock State School in neighbouring Woodstock to the north-west, and Giru State School in Giru to the north. The nearest government secondary schools are Home Hill State High School in Home Hill to the east and Ayr State High School in Ayr to the north-east; however, these secondary schools may be too distant for a daily commute for students living in the south-west of Upper Haughton and so other options are distance education and boarding school.
