= Wangaratta, Queensland =

Wangaratta
- Suburb
- Interactive map of Wangaratta
- Coordinates: 19.8287°S 147.4613°E
- Country: Australia
- State: Queensland
- LGA: Shire of Burdekin
- Location: 14.9 km (9.3 mi) SE of Home Hill; 26.3 km (16.3 mi) SE of Ayr; 113 km (70 mi) SE of Townsville; 1,245 km (774 mi) NNW of Brisbane

Government
  - State electorate: Burdekin
  - Federal division: Dawson

Area
  - Total: 186.7 km^{2} (72.1 sq mi)

Population
  - Total: 29 (2021 census)
  - Density: 0.1553/km^{2} (0.402/sq mi)
- Time zone: UTC+10:00 (AEST)
- Postcode: 4806
Suburbs around Wangaratta
Fredericksfield	Inkerman	Wunjunga
Kirknie	Wangaratta	Gumlu
Kirknie	Rangemore	Gumlu

Wangaratta is a rural locality in the Shire of Burdekin, Queensland, Australia. In the 2021 census, Wangaratta had a population of 29 people.

== Geography ==
The Bruce Highway enters the locality from the south-west (Gumlu) and forms the western boundary of the locality, exiting to the north (Fredericksfield / Inkerman). The North Coast railway line runs immediately parallel and west of the highway with the locality served by:

- Inkerman railway station in the north-east of the locality (19.7519°S 147.4919°E)
- Koberinga railway station (now abandoned, 19.7944°S 147.5308°E)

The land use is predominantly grazing on native vegetation with some crop growing (mostly sugarcane near the highway).

== Demographics ==
In the 2016 census, Wangaratta had a population of 27 people.

In the 2021 census, Wangaratta had a population of 29 people.

== Education ==
There are no schools in Wangaratta. The nearest government primary schools are Osborne State School in Osborne to the north-west, Home Hill State School in Home Hill to the north, and Gumlu State School in neighbouring Gumlu to the east. The nearest government secondary school is Home Hill State High School in Home Hill. There is also a Catholic primary school in Home Hill and other church-operated schools in Ayr.
