= Mount Kelly, Queensland =

Mount Kelly
- Suburb
- Interactive map of Mount Kelly
- Coordinates: 19.6672°S 147.315°E
- Country: Australia
- State: Queensland
- LGA: Shire of Burdekin
- Location: 15.6 km (9.7 mi) W of Home Hill; 17.6 km (10.9 mi) SW of Ayr; 92.7 km (57.6 mi) SE of Townsville; 1,281 km (796 mi) NNW of Brisbane

Government
  - State electorate: Burdekin
  - Federal division: Dawson

Area
  - Total: 46.8 km^{2} (18.1 sq mi)

Population
  - Total: 291 (2021 census)
  - Density: 6.218/km^{2} (16.10/sq mi)
- Time zone: UTC+10:00 (AEST)
- Postcode: 4807
Suburbs around Mount Kelly
Barratta	Airville	Airville
Mona Park	Mount Kelly	Airville
Mona Park	Kirknie	Osborne

Mount Kelly is a rural locality in the Shire of Burdekin, Queensland, Australia. In the 2021 census, Mount Kelly had a population of 291 people.

== Geography ==
The locality is bounded to the south and south-east by the Burdekin River.

Kelly Mountain is a mountain in the centre of the locality (19.6621°S 147.3134°E) rising to 186 metres (610 ft) above sea level.

The land use is quite varied. To the south-east of the Kelly Mountain is an area of rural residential housing. The land near the northern, eastern and southern boundaries of the locality is used to grow sugarcane and there is a cane tramway to transport the harvested sugarcane to the local sugar mills. There is grazing on native vegetation in the north, west, and south-west of the locality. There are number of small quarries in the locality.

== History ==
The locality was officially named and bounded on 23 February 2001. It is presumably named after Kelly Mountain.

== Demographics ==
In the 2016 census, Mount Kelly had a population of 280 people.

In the 2021 census, Mount Kelly had a population of 291 people.

== Education ==
There are no school in Mount Kelly. The nearest government primary school is Airville State School in neighbouring Airville to the east. The nearest government secondary schools are Ayr State High School in Ayr to the north-east and Home Hill State High School in Home Hill to the east.

== Facilities ==
Mount Kelly Rural Fire Station is at 74-79 Kelly Drive (19.6605°S 147.3231°E).

== Attractions ==
Mount Kelly Lookout is at the top of Lookout Road (19.66520°S 147.31644°E).

There is a pistol club at 1478 Ayr Dalbeg Road (19.7016°S 147.2827°E).
