= Mulgrave, Queensland =

Mulgrave
- Suburb
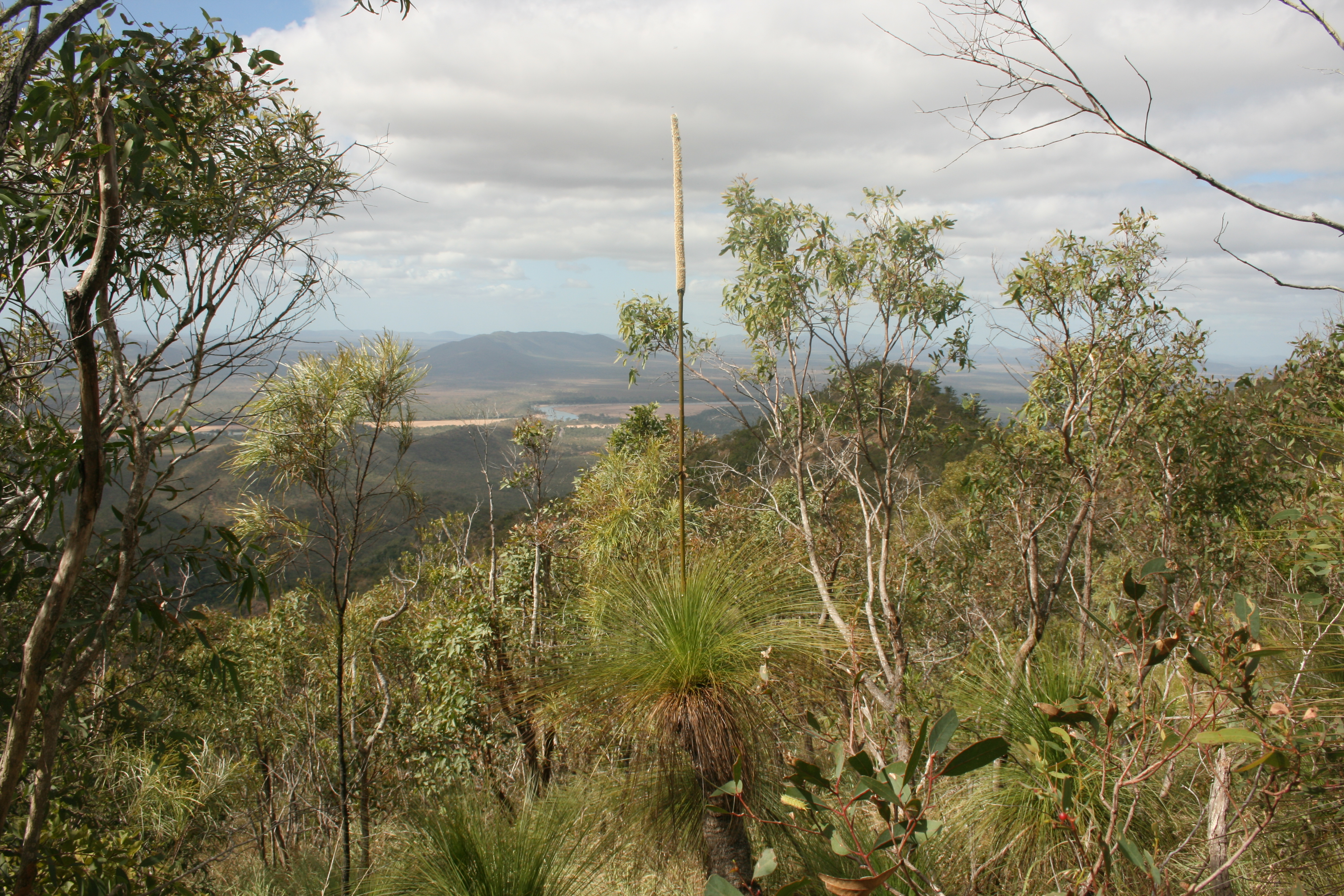
- View from Mount Dalrymple, 2011

- Interactive map of Mulgrave
- Coordinates: 19.9544°S 147.0338°E
- Country: Australia
- State: Queensland
- LGA: Shire of Burdekin
- Location: 76.3 km (47.4 mi) SW of Home Hill; 78.3 km (48.7 mi) SW of Ayr; 126 km (78 mi) S of Townsville; 1,342 km (834 mi) NNW of Brisbane

Government
  - State electorate: Burdekin
  - Federal division: Kennedy

Area
  - Total: 819.8 km^{2} (316.5 sq mi)

Population
  - Total: 19 (2021 census)
  - Density: 0.0232/km^{2} (0.0600/sq mi)
- Time zone: UTC+10:00 (AEST)
- Postcode: 4807
Suburbs around Mulgrave
Ravenswood	Upper Haughton	Clare
Ravenswood	Mulgrave	Kirknie; Millaroo
Ravenswood	Swans Lagoon	Swans Lagoon

Mulgrave is a rural locality in the Shire of Burdekin, Queensland, Australia. In the 2021 census, Mulgrave had a population of 19 people.

== Geography ==
Although the Shire of Burdekin is mostly lower-lying land used for growing sugarcane, Mulgrave in the south-west of the shire has more mountainous terrain, with a number of named peaks and gorges (from north to south):

- Woodhouse Mountain (19.8376°S 147.1312°E) 155 metres (509 ft)
- Bunkers Hill (19.9300°S 146.9343°E) 430 metres (1,410 ft)
- Nanny Goat Gorge (19.9336°S 146.9163°E)
- Mount Dalrymple (19.9379°S 147.1683°E) 580 metres (1,900 ft)
- Bird Gorge (19.9611°S 146.9260°E)
- Mount Benjonney (19.9659°S 147.0806°E) 442 metres (1,450 ft)
- Blue Mountain (20.0062°S 146.9132°E) 616 metres (2,021 ft)

There is some crop growing (including sugarcane) in the lower north-eastern part of the locality, but otherwise the predominant land use is grazing on native vegetation.

== History ==
The locality was officially named and bounded on 23 February 2001.

== Demographics ==
In the 2016 census, Mulgrave had a population of 21 people.

In the 2021 census, Mulgrave had a population of 19 people.

== Education ==
There are no schools in Mulgrave. The nearest government primary schools are Clare State School in neighbouring Clare to the north-east and Millaroo State School in neighbouring Millaroo to the south-east. The nearest government secondary school is Home Hill State High School in Home Hill to the north-east. However, it is too distant from much of the locality for a daily commute and the options are distance education and boarding school.
