= Kirknie, Queensland =

Kirknie
- Suburb
- Interactive map of Kirknie
- Coordinates: 19.8558°S 147.3016°E
- Country: Australia
- State: Queensland
- LGA: Shire of Burdekin
- Location: 19.9 km (12.4 mi) SW of Home Hill; 27.3 km (17.0 mi) SW of Ayr; 113 km (70 mi) SE of Townsville; 1,281 km (796 mi) NNW of Brisbane

Government
  - State electorate: Burdekin
  - Federal division: Dawson

Area
  - Total: 393.2 km^{2} (151.8 sq mi)
- Elevation: 10–480 m (33–1,575 ft)

Population
  - Total: 70 (2021 census)
  - Density: 0.178/km^{2} (0.46/sq mi)
- Time zone: UTC+10:00 (AEST)
- Postcode: 4806
Suburbs around Kirknie
Mona Park; Clare	Mount Kelly; Osborne	Fredericksfield
Mulgrave	Kirknie	Wangaratta
Millaroo	Bogie	Rangemore

Kirknie is a rural locality in the Shire of Burdekin, Queensland, Australia. In the 2021 census, Kirknie had a population of 70 people.

== Geography ==
The locality is bounded to the west by the Burdekin River and to the south by the Bogie River.

The west and centre of the locality are at relatively low elevations, but the terrain rises steeply in other parts of the locality. The Stokes Range is in the north (19.7475°S 147.3307°E) rising to elevations of 170 metres (560 ft). Mount Leslie is in the east (19.8112°S 147.3849°E) at 159 metres (522 ft). Mount Louisa is in the south (19.8895°S 147.3053°E) rising to 488 metres (1,601 ft), together with the Gregory Ranges (19.9452°S 147.3523°E).

The west and centre of the locality are used for crop growing, predominantly sugarcane. The rest of the locality is used for grazing on native vegetation.

There is a cane tramway to transport the harvested sugarcane to the Inkerman Sugar Mill in Home Hill.

== History ==
The locality was officially named and bounded on 23 February 2001.

== Demographics ==
In the 2016 census, Kirknie had a population of 58 people.

In the 2021 census, Kirknie had a population of 70 people.

== Education ==
There are no schools in Kirknie. The nearest government primary school is Osborne State School in neighbouring Osborne to the north. The nearest government secondary school is Home Hill State High School in Home Hill to the north-east.
