= Mona Park, Queensland =

Mona Park
- Suburb
- Interactive map of Mona Park
- Coordinates: 19.6958°S 147.2372°E
- Country: Australia
- State: Queensland
- LGA: Shire of Burdekin
- Location: 25.8 km (16.0 mi) W of Home Hill; 26.1 km (16.2 mi) SW of Ayr; 87.1 km (54.1 mi) SE of Townsville; 1,291 km (802 mi) NNW of Brisbane

Government
  - State electorate: Burdekin
  - Federal division: Dawson

Area
  - Total: 103.7 km^{2} (40.0 sq mi)

Population
  - Total: 97 (2021 census)
  - Density: 0.935/km^{2} (2.423/sq mi)
- Time zone: UTC+10:00 (AEST)
- Postcode: 4807
Suburbs around Mona Park
| Upper Haughton | Barratta | Mount Kelly |
| Upper Haughton | Mona Park | Mount Kelly |
| Upper Haughton | Clare | Kirknie |

Mona Park is a rural locality in the Shire of Burdekin, Queensland, Australia. In the 2021 census, Mona Park had a population of 97 people.

== Geography ==
The locality is bounded to the south-east by the Burdekin River and to the north-west by Barratta Creek.

The land is mostly low-lying with elevations of 10 to 20 metres (33 to 66 ft) above sea level but there is an unnamed peak risking to 110 metres (360 ft) in the north-east of the locality.

The predominant land use is growing sugarcane on th lower-lying areas and there is a network of cane tramways to transport the harvested sugarcane to the Iocal sugar mills. The higher ground is used for grazing on native vegetation. There is also some irrigated crop growing near the river.

== History ==
The locality was officially named and bounded on 23 February 2001.

== Demographics ==
In the 2016 census, Mona Park had a population of 104 people.

In the 2021 census, Mona Park had a population of 97 people.

== Education ==
There are no schools in Mona Park. The nearest government primary schools are Clare State School in neighbouring Clare to the south and Airville State School in Airville to the north-east. The nearest government secondary schools are Ayr State High School in Ayr to the north-east and Home Hill State High School in Home Hill to the east.
