= Eight Mile Creek, Queensland =

Eight Mile Creek
- Suburb
- Interactive map of Eight Mile Creek
- Coordinates: 20.2833°S 147.2280°E
- Country: Australia
- State: Queensland
- LGA: Shire of Burdekin
- Location: 31.7 km (19.7 mi) S of Millaroo; 127 km (79 mi) SSW of Ayr; 156 km (97 mi) SSE of Townsville; 1,353 km (841 mi) NNW of Brisbane

Government
  - State electorate: Burdekin
  - Federal division: Kennedy

Area
  - Total: 319.1 km^{2} (123.2 sq mi)

Population
  - Total: 0 (2021 census)
  - Density: 0.0000/km^{2} (0.000/sq mi)
- Time zone: UTC+10:00 (AEST)
- Postcode: 4807
Suburbs around Eight Mile Creek
Swans Lagoon	Swans Lagoon	Dalbeg
Ravenswood	Eight Mile Creek	Bogie
Ravenswood	Ravenswood	Mount Wyatt

Eight Mile Creek is a rural locality in the Shire of Burdekin, Queensland, Australia. In the 2021 census, Eight Mile Creek had "no people or a very low population".

== Geography ==
The Burdekin River forms the southern part of the eastern boundary, while Expedition Pass Creek forms the northern boundary. Eight Mile Creek (the watercourse) forms the northern part of the eastern boundary until it joins Expedition Pass Creek on its way to the Burdekin.

The land use is almost entirely grazing on native vegetation.

== History ==
The locality was officially named and bounded on 23 February 2001.

== Demographics ==
In the 2016 census, Eight Mile Creek had "no people or a very low population".

In the 2021 census, Eight Mile Creek had "no people or a very low population".

== Education ==
There are no schools in Eight Mile Creek. The nearest government primary school is Millaroo State School in Millaroo to the north. There are no nearby secondary schools; distance education and boarding school are the alternatives.
