= Wangaratta (disambiguation) =

Wangaratta is a city in the northeast of Victoria, Australia

It can also mean:

- Wangaratta, a Swedish board-game published by Alga, later BRIO, named after the Victoria city
- Wangaratta, Queensland, a locality in Australia
