= Home Hill Powerhouse =

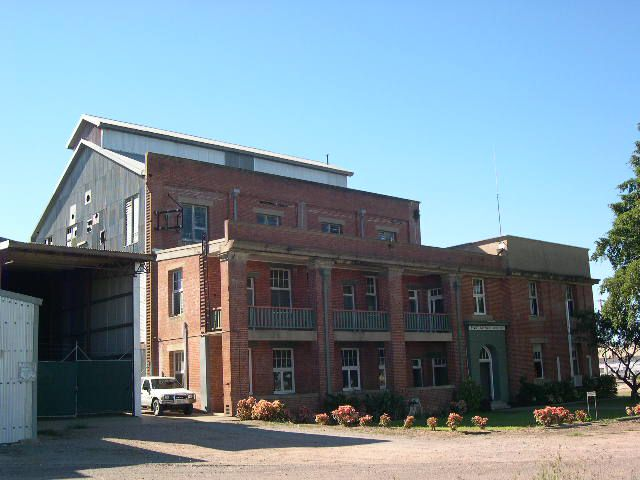
- Home Hill Powerhouse

- Location within Queensland Location within Australia
- 19.6697°S 147.4125°E
- Location: First Avenue, Home Hill, Shire of Burdekin, Queensland, Australia

History
- Design period: 1919–1930s (interwar period)
- Built: c. 1921–1922

Queensland Heritage Register
- Official name: Home Hill Powerhouse, Inkerman Irrigation Area Power House
- Type: state heritage (built)
- Designated: 2 August 2004
- Reference no.: 601718
- Significant period: 1922 (fabric); 1922–1932, 1932–1947, 1947–1953 (historical)
- Significant components: office/administration building, machinery/plant/equipment – manufacturing/processing, machinery/plant/equipment – utilities – gas/electricity supply, engine/generator shed/room / power supply

Home Hill Powerhouse is a heritage-listed power station at First Avenue, Home Hill, Shire of Burdekin, Queensland, Australia. It was built from c. 1921 to 1922. It is also known as Inkerman Irrigation Area Power House. It was added to the Queensland Heritage Register on 2 August 2004.

== History ==
The Home Hill Powerhouse, a substantial brick and corrugated iron structure located in First Avenue, Home Hill, was completed in 1922 as part of the Inkerman Irrigation Area Scheme. At the time it was the largest powerhouse in North Queensland, supplying power for irrigation purposes to the farmers (mainly sugar cane growers) on the Inkerman Estate until 1953.

The Inkerman Repurchased Estate, formerly part of Inkerman Station, was opened for selection on 8 December 1911, principally as sugar-growing land. Easy terms encouraged many people with little or no farming experience to take up blocks, and within a year, many of the 500 families who had settled at Inkerman had exhausted their limited capital and were heavily in debt. One drought convinced them that irrigation was essential, but few could afford to irrigate with individual pumping plants.

In January 1913 the Inkerman Farmers and Graziers Association began lobbying the Queensland Government for the provision of a government-subsidised irrigation scheme for their district, modeled on the Murrumbidgee Irrigation Scheme in New South Wales, which utilised a central powerhouse to supply power to irrigation pumps on surrounding farms. In February 1913 the Assistant Engineer of the Water Supply Department, HEA Eklund, visited Ayr to report on the proposal. Eklund determined that there was adequate water beneath most Inkerman farms, and supported the idea of a communal irrigation scheme, which would be the first of its kind in North Queensland. Eklund calculated that a central powerhouse could serve 135 farms of an average size of 50 hectares (120 acres). Although his initial estimate at £74,000 was rejected as too costly, this was revised in 1915 to £131,000 as more people settled in the area. However, the costs now were spread across more farms, Eklund estimating the cost of power at less than a penny per unit, far cheaper than the Murrumbidgee Irrigation Area, which then was less than a sixth the size of that proposed for Home Hill.

In May 1915 Queensland's first secure Labor government took office. Under the leadership of Premier T. J. Ryan and sponsoring a policy of State capitalism, the new Queensland Labor Government set about acquiring State enterprises. In July 1916 the Inkerman irrigation scheme was approved. The Inkerman Water Supply Board was constituted in February 1917 to manage and repay the capital cost over 28 years, the anticipated life of the plant. Detailed survey work was undertaken and by the end of the year, 100 well sites had been tested, 70 selected, and a contract for the manufacture of reinforced concrete casing let to Hume Brothers of Melbourne, with production commencing in late 1918.

The cost of the scheme escalated due to inflation after First World War. Shortages and strikes following the war delayed the construction of the central powerhouse, the cost of which had risen by 150 percent. The cost of well sinking had nearly quadrupled, and the number of transmission lines had doubled. In 1921 a fresh estimate put the cost of the scheme at £392,361.

On 15 May 1922 Premier Ted Theodore performed the official opening, although the main turbine was not yet completed. The powerhouse provided electricity to the town of Home Hill (surveyed in 1911 to service the Inkerman Repurchased Estate and developed from c. 1913), and to a few Inkerman farmers for irrigation purposes with the rest waiting to be connected. The central powerhouse could not drive all the pumps at once, and to prevent overload, power was provided in rotation, whilst at night there was hardly any load on the system.

Under the Irrigation Act of 1922 control passed to the Irrigation and Water Supply Commission, which found many discrepancies between the book values and actual worth of many of the assets. All the dead and abandoned wells were written off, and the value of the powerhouse building halved as it was considered that a less elaborate structure would have served as well. £171, 478 was wiped off the capital assets giving a net worth of £235,000. By mid 1923 nearly £400,000 had been spent yet only 1,000 hectares (2,500 acres) were irrigated. Inevitably, the half-complete scheme lost money. Although wartime conditions had contributed, the Water Supply Department had to share the blame; there had been no proper supervision to control well-sinking costs, and operating costs were high with a large powerhouse running at night just to power lights in Home Hill.

1931 was so dry that the powerhouse worked 24 hours per day from March to June. Farmers were rostered to maintain an even demand day and night. The installation of meters at last ensured that water and power were not wasted. For the first time the operation made a profit of nearly £3,000 after paying interest, its first contribution to paying off the capital cost.

The Moore Government, which replaced the Labor administration in 1929, sold most of the State Enterprises, and accepted the Inkerman farmers proposal to take over the district's power supply and irrigation scheme. The first meeting of the Inkerman Irrigation Board was held on 23 June 1932. The Board made farmers responsible for maintaining their own pumps, motors, wells and spear systems from 1 July 1932 and fixed the water rate at £6.

Local management of the irrigation scheme increased confidence. The Board met the interest bill on the reduced capital as well as redemption on the loan, besides setting aside £6,000 annually as required under the Water Act for renewals and extensions. By June 1935 it was comfortably in surplus. The supply of power to Home Hill increased year by year, and despite a reduction in charges, remained profitable.

During the Second World War the rapid deployment of troops to North Queensland overtaxed the Townsville Power Station and new generating equipment was almost impossible to obtain. As its peak demand was at night, and Home Hill's by day, the Inkerman Irrigation Board agreed to supply electricity to Townsville. FA Rockets and Son completed the Home Hill-Townsville link in July 1944. After technical problems were overcome, the first current was fed to Townsville on 5 August 1944. Home Hill's surplus power was insufficient, and an extra diesel plant was installed at Townsville, but the sale of power boosted the Irrigation Board's finances.

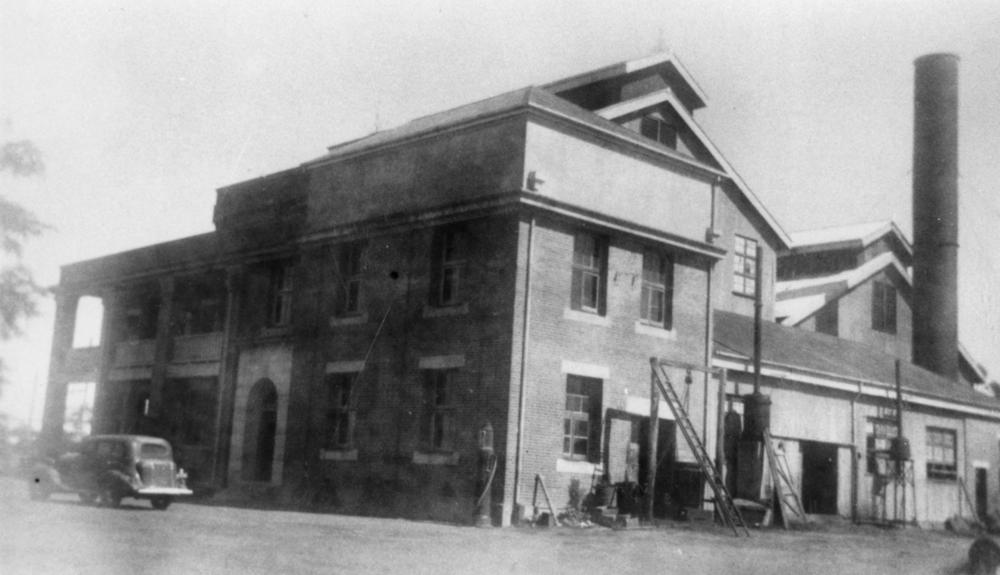
Home Hill Power Station, ca. 1946

The State Electricity Commission established a regional electricity board at Townsville in December 1945. A mass meeting of Inkerman Irrigation Board farmers in June 1946 endorsed the Townsville Regional Board's takeover proposal. Under an amendment to the Electric Light and Power Acts passed later that year, the powerhouse was sold as from 1 January 1947 for £105,000, £28,449 less than the outstanding debt to Treasury. After a cash payment for coal and stores and sale of electric motors to farmers, the Irrigation Board paid half the difference and the rest was written off.

By 1948, most of the power was flowing from Townsville to Home Hill, over 3 million units per annum, 14 times the flow in the opposite direction. Home Hill Powerhouse continued to operate 16 hours per day until the commissioning of the new Townsville generating station on 11 May 1953. Eight days later the Home Hill Powerhouse, whose whistle had blown every day at 8am, 12 noon, 1 pm and 5 pm, regulating local working hours, for 31 years, was decommissioned.

In the mid-1960s rice growing emerged as an important new agricultural pursuit for the Burdekin. In 1969 the former Home Hill Powerhouse was officially opened by the Premier of Queensland, the Hon. Joh Bjelke-Petersen, as the Lower Burdekin Rice Producers Co-operative Association Ltd's rice mill.

Considerable infrastructure for the rice milling process was developed round the former Power House. During this time the shed located on the northern side of the power house was removed and replaced by a single story corrugated iron skillion shed. Some internal partitioning and office walls of concrete block were constructed on the ground floor of the Power House building. The machinery and machinery foundations were removed from the machine shed which is located against the eastern facade of the three storey generator building.

More recently the complex has housed agricultural chemicals for the sugar industry.

== Description ==
The former Home Hill Powerhouse is a brick and corrugated iron structure situated on a large block in First Avenue, Home Hill. The surviving original powerhouse structure comprises two main elements: an administration area and the generator house.

The administration area is a two-storeyed asymmetrical building constructed of brick on concrete foundations and has wings on both sides of a central round arch doorway. The building has a small frontispiece, which is painted green. The arch doorway is surmounted by a pediment decorated with the date of construction of the building, "A.D.1922" and the name of the present function of the building, "Pivot Service Centre". The doorway opens to an entrance hall and staircase, which leads to the first floor. The staircase is constructed of concrete with an iron handrail.

The western wing has narrow brickwork columns dividing the facade into three bays. It supports a verandah on the ground and first floors. The ground floor has been partitioned into three rooms: a laboratory, storeroom and galley kitchen. The interior walls are rendered and are painted white. The first floor has been partitioned into two rooms with a timber-framed wall, which were bare of any fixtures and fittings and have a very simple interior.

The ground floor of the eastern wing contains the main administration office of "Pivot Agriculture" and consists of one large room, which has been divided into offices and includes a reception area and front counter.

The first floor of the eastern wing consists of one large room, now vacant, but recently used as offices. The interior has been modified with the inclusion of a false ceiling and timber panelling for office partitioning. The original timber windows have been replaced with aluminium windows.

The former generator building is reached via a single doorway at the rear of the entrance hallway, with another doorway on the first floor also located at the rear of the entrance hallway. Access to the former generator building was limited to a narrow walkway that leads to the rear of the building. The former generator building is a three-storey structure with a concrete floor covering part of the first floor level. The building contains the remains of the power plant, including steel pipes, fans and fluming.

Two large rice storage bins have been constructed at the first floor level. These bins are located on a platform supported by concrete piers. The bins are positioned on the northern side of the three-storey generator building.

A newly constructed corrugated iron warehouse abuts the rear of the building. To the west of the powerhouse is a long corrugated iron clad building, possibly associated with the former use of the place as a rice factory.

== Heritage listing ==
Home Hill Powerhouse was listed on the Queensland Heritage Register on 2 August 2004 having satisfied the following criteria.

The place is important in demonstrating the evolution or pattern of Queensland's history.

The former Home Hill Powerhouse is important in demonstrating the evolution of Queensland's history, in particular the pivotal role of irrigation in the development of the sugar industry in North Queensland. The former powerhouse provided electricity for pumping water for irrigation purposes, to early settlers on the Inkerman Repurchased Estate who otherwise would have been unable to grow sugarcane. The irrigation system demonstrates the pattern of state enterprises administered by Queensland's first functional Labor Government under the leadership of Premier TJ Ryan.

The place is important in demonstrating the principal characteristics of a particular class of cultural places.

The place is important in demonstrating the principal characteristics of its type: a substantial central powerhouse with brick office building and attached corrugated iron and brick generating building.

The place has a strong or special association with a particular community or cultural group for social, cultural or spiritual reasons.

The Home Hill Powerhouse has a special association with the Home Hill community as the provider of power for their irrigation system initially and later their shops and homes. The community was involved in the initial construction of the irrigation system and later took over its operation and maintenance. The powerhouse regulated working hours in Home Hill for 31 years by habitually blowing its whistle every day at 8am, 12 noon, 1 pm and 5 pm.
