= Clare Solar Farm =

Solar farm in Queensland, Australia

Coordinates: 19°50′28″S 147°12′20″E

The Clare Solar Farm is a solar farm located 35 kilometres south-west of Ayr at Clare in North Queensland, Australia. The 125 megawatt DC power station is owned by Lighthouse Solar. Construction commenced in 2016 and was complete by May 2018. It features 393,300 single-axis tracking panels spread over 300 hectares. The solar panels were supplied by Trina Solar.

Electricity was first exported to the grid in 2018.

The power station has a power purchase agreement with Origin Energy. Operations and maintenance contracts were awarded to Downer EDI.

== See also ==
- List of solar farms in Queensland
