= Inkerman Bridge =

Railway bridge in Queensland, Australia

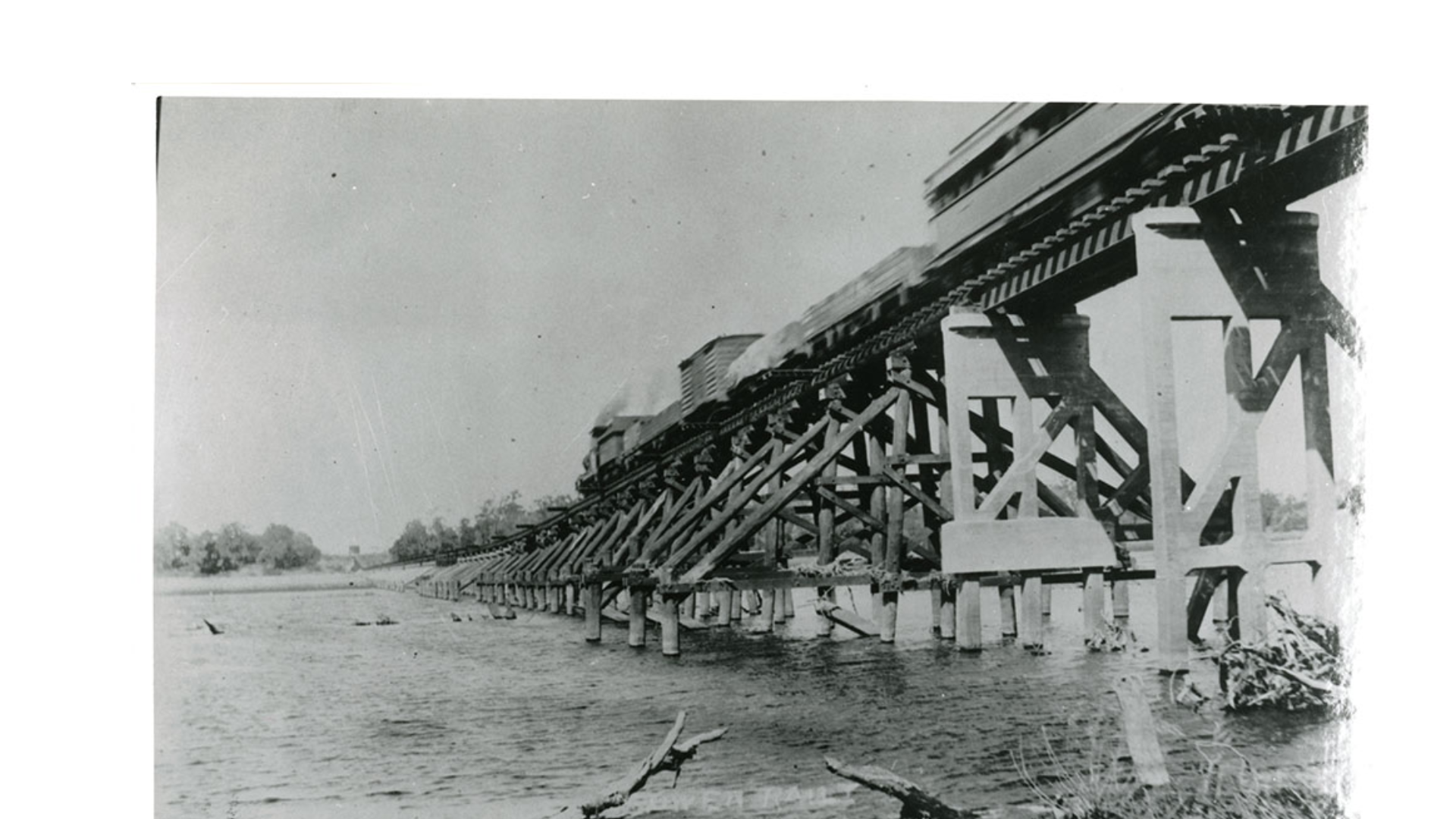
- First train from Bowen to cross the Inkerman Bridge, 1913
- Coordinates: 19.6396°S 147.3952°E
- Carries: North Coast railway line
- Crosses: Burdekin River
- Locale: McDesme (north), Home Hill (south), Shire of Burdekin, Queensland, Australia
- Followed by: Burdekin Bridge

Characteristics
- Total length: 830 yd 1 ft (37.7 chains; 759.3 m)
- No. of spans: 129

History
- Construction start: 1912
- Construction end: 1913
- Construction cost: £18,000
- Opened: 8 September 1913

Location
- Interactive map of Inkerman Bridge

The Inkerman Bridge was a railway bridge over the Burdekin River between McDesme and Home Hill, both in the Shire of Burdekin, Queensland, Australia. It was in operation between 1913 and 1957 after which it was replaced by the Burdekin Bridge (also known as the Silver Link).

== History ==
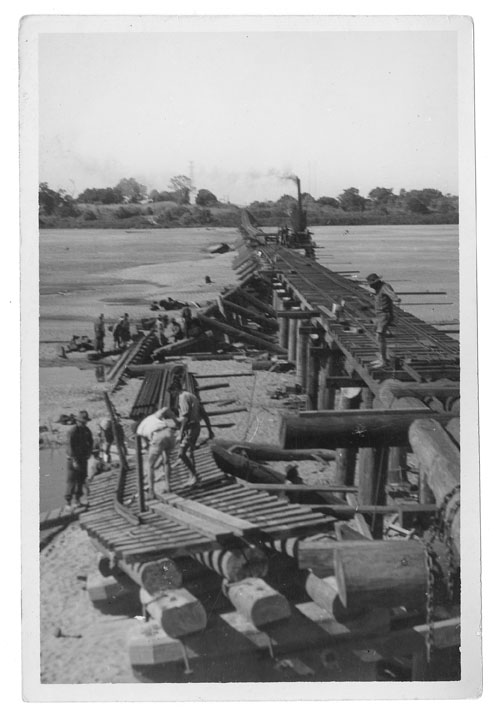
Repair flood damage, October 1940

The Inkerman Bridge was built as part of the North Coast railway line along the Queensland coast that ultimately linked Brisbane to Cairns by rail. Construction commenced in 1912 and the bridge officially opened on Monday 8 September 1913.

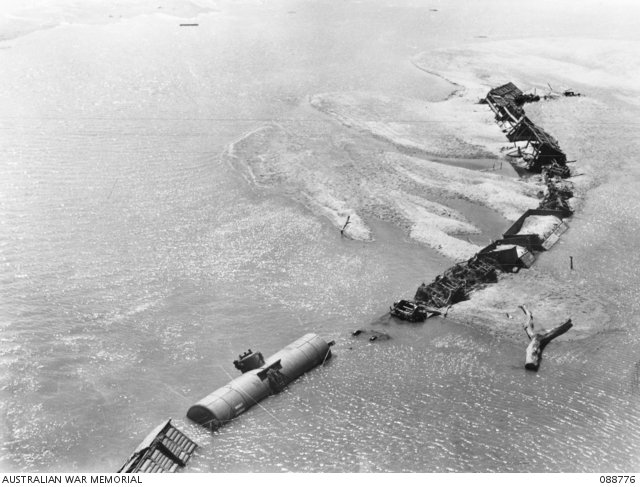
Wreckage of a goods train washed off the bridge in March 1945 still lies submerged on the river bed in April 1945

The bridge was low-lying and the Burdekin River frequently flooded. As a result, the bridge was frequently closed due to water over the bridge or because the bridge was damaged by floods leading to months of closure while it was repaired.

On 8 March 1945 a goods train was swept off the bridge in a sudden surge of flood water. Two people drowned, while four others survived by freeing the cattle on board and then "rode" down the river holding onto the steers until they were rescued downstream at various locations as far as Rita Island. The bridge went at least 11 feet (3.4 m) under water in that flood. The disaster renewed demands that a higher-level bridge be built.

In 1947 a project commenced to build a high-level road-and-rail bridge to replace the Inkerman Bridge, but owing to the sandy soil without any rock to provide foundations for a higher bridge, it took ten years to design and construct the Burdekin Bridge which opened on 27 March 1957.

== Remnants ==
Some remnants of the old bridge are still visible 100 metres (330 ft) downstream (east) of the Burdekin Bridge.
