= McDesme, Queensland =

McDesme
- Suburb
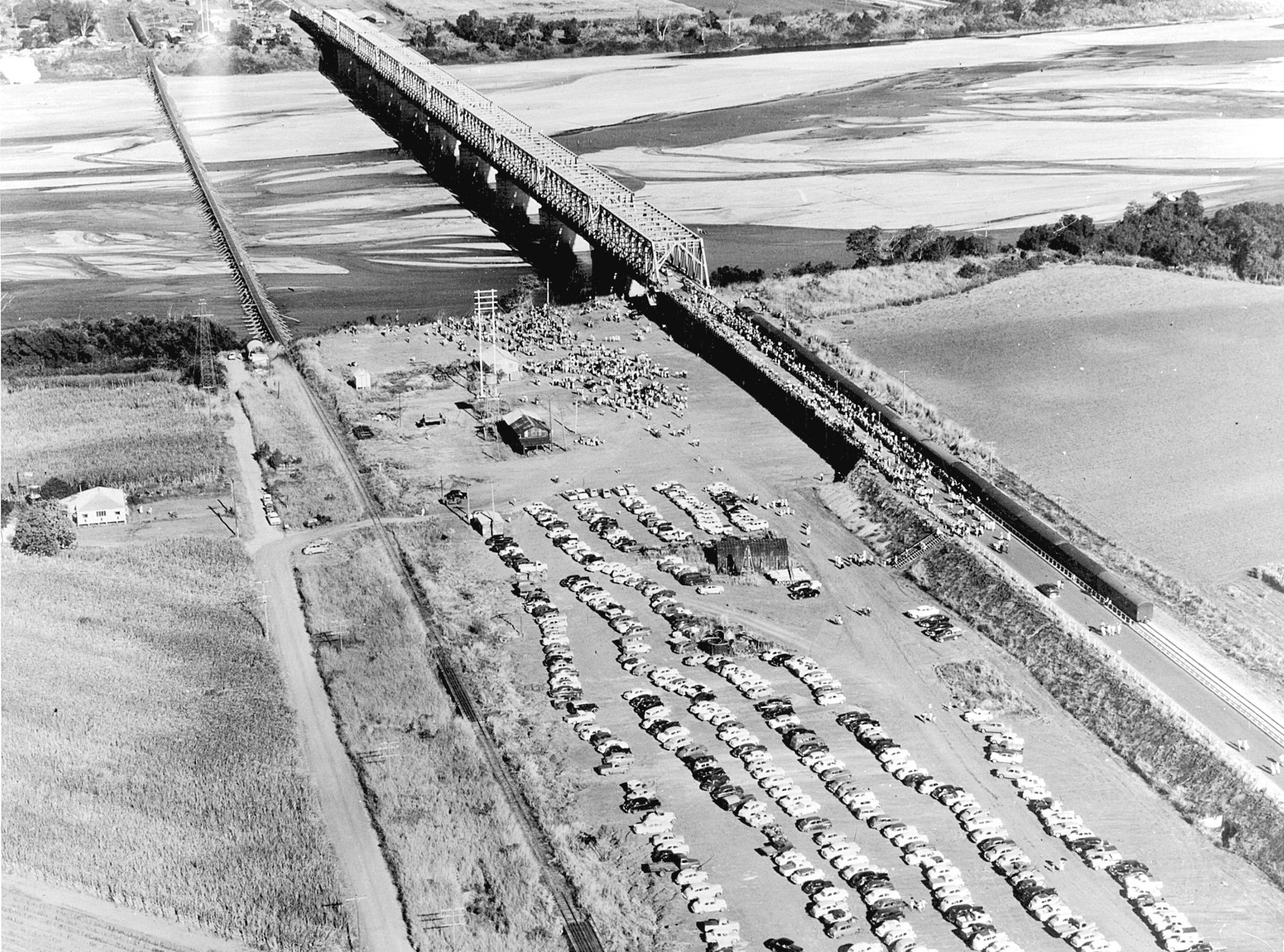
- Official opening of Burdekin Bridge, 15 June 1957, as seen from the Ayr/McDesme side of the river

- Interactive map of McDesme
- Coordinates: 19.62°S 147.3986°E
- Country: Australia
- State: Queensland
- LGA: Shire of Burdekin
- Location: 5.2 km (3.2 mi) SSW of Ayr; 90.8 km (56.4 mi) SE of Townsville; 1,264 km (785 mi) NNW of Brisbane

Government
  - State electorate: Burdekin
  - Federal division: Dawson

Area
  - Total: 25.4 km^{2} (9.8 sq mi)

Population
  - Total: 254 (2021 census)
  - Density: 10.00/km^{2} (25.90/sq mi)
- Time zone: UTC+10:00 (AEST)
- Postcode: 4807
Suburbs around McDesme
Brandon	Ayr	Jarvisfield
Airville	McDesme	Jarvisfield
Airville	Home Hill	Carstairs

McDesme is a rural locality in the Shire of Burdekin, Queensland, Australia. In the 2021 census, McDesme had a population of 254 people.

== Geography ==
The locality is bounded to the north and north-east by Kilne Road, to the south by the Burdekin River, to the south-west and west by Plantation Creek, and to the north-west by Robertson Road and Webber Road.

The Bruce Highway enters the locality from the south (Home Hill across the river via the Burdekin Bridge) and exits the locality to the north (Ayr).

The North Coast railway line also enters the locality from the south (Home Hill across the river via the Burdekin Bridge) and exits to the north (Ayr). There are three now-abandoned railway stations on the line within the locality:

- Macdesme railway station (19.6170°S 147.3865°E)
- Katoora railway station (19.6306°S 147.3867°E)
- Marali railway station (19.6376°S 147.3918°E)

The land use is predominantly growing sugarcane. There is a network of cane tramways to transport the harvested sugar cane to the Pioneer Sugar Mill.

== History ==
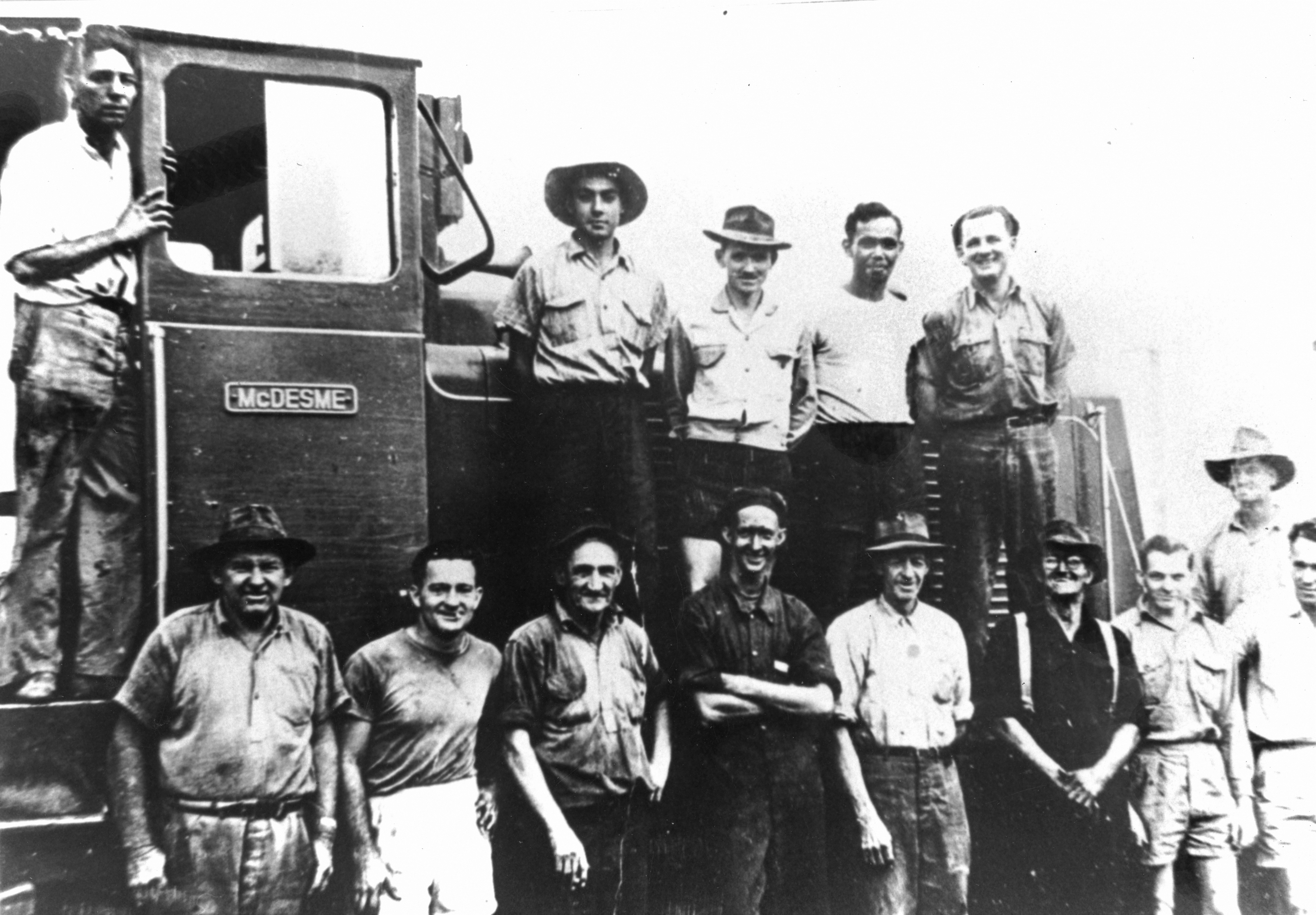
Pioneer Mill tramway operations workers with locomotive McDesme

The Marali railway station was named on 9 November 1917. Marali is an Aboriginal word meaning tomorrow.

McDesme Provisional School opened in 1905. On 1 January 1909, it became McDesme State School. It closed circa 1964. The school was on a 5-acre (2.0 ha) site on the south-east corner of McDesme Road and Old Home Hill Road (19.61550°S 147.40058°E).

The Inkerman Bridge across the Burdekin River to Home Hill officially opened on 8 September 1913. The bridge carried the North Coast railway line. As the nearest road bridge across the river was 37 miles (60 km) upstream, a low-level road bridge was built across the river (19.6283°S 147.4044°E) in 1929 and was completed in January 1930 and within two weeks was 3 feet (0.91 m) under water due to the river flooding. Due to the frequent flooding of the river, the rail and road bridges were often closed or damaged, leading to the decision to build a single higher-level road-and-rail bridge. Due to the lack of rock in the sandy soil to use as foundations, for many years it was not believed possible to build a high-level bridge across the Burdekin River. However, by copying construction techniques used in India for sand-footing bridges, work began on the Burdekin Bridge (also known as the Silver Link) in April 1947 but it was not operational until 27 March 1957. The new bridge was 100 metres (330 ft) upstream of the Inkerman Bridge. The Burdekin Bridge officially opened on 15 June 1957. At 1,097 metres (3,599 ft), the Burdekin Bridge is one of the longest multi-span bridges in Australia and the only one in Australia without a firm footing. Some pylons of the Inkerman Bridge are still visible.

== Demographics ==
In the 2016 census, McDesme had a population of 277 people.

In the 2021 census, McDesme had a population of 254 people.

== Education ==
There are no schools in McDesme. The nearest government primary schools are:

- Ayr State School in neighbouring Ayr to the north
- Jarvisfield State School in neighbouring Jarvisfield to the east
- Home Hill State School in neighbouring Home Hill to the south
- Airville State School in neighbouring Airville to the south-west
- Maidavale State School, also in Airville to the west

The nearest government secondary schools are Ayr State High School in Ayr and Home Hill State High School in Home Hill.

There are also non-government schools in Ayr and Home Hill.
