= Fredericksfield =

- Suburb
- Interactive map of Fredericksfield
- Coordinates: 19.7387°S 147.4052°E
- Country: Australia
- State: Queensland
- LGA: Shire of Burdekin
- Location: 8.4 km (5.2 mi) S of Home Hill; 19.8 km (12.3 mi) S of Ayr; 105 km (65 mi) SE of Townsville; 1,259 km (782 mi) NNW of Brisbane

Government
  - State electorate: Burdekin
  - Federal division: Dawson

Area
  - Total: 102.4 km^{2} (39.5 sq mi)

Population
  - Total: 259 (2021 census)
  - Density: 2.529/km^{2} (6.551/sq mi)
- Time zone: UTC+10:00 (AEST)
- Postcode: 4806
Suburbs around Fredericksfield
Osborne	Home Hill	Inkerman
Kirknie	Fredericksfield	Inkerman
Kirknie	Wangaratta	Wangaratta

Fredericksfield is a rural locality in the Shire of Burdekin, Queensland, Australia. In the 2021 census, Fredericksfield had a population of 259 people.

== Geography ==
The locality is bounded to the east by the North Coast railway line. There were a number of railway stations serving the locality but all are now abandoned:

- Berdaje railway station (19.7419°S 147.4745°E)
- Keebah railway station (19.7284°S 147.4626°E)
- Iyah railway station (19.7119°S 147.4486°E)
- Koolkuna railway station (19.7023°S 147.4404°E)

== History ==
Iyah State School opened on 6 September 1920. In 1945, there were complaints of overcrowding with 44 students enrolled and an average attendance of 38 students and only one teacher. The school closed on 31 December 1963. It was located at 13 Charlies Hill Road (19.7102°S 147.4491°E).

== Demographics ==
In the 2016 census, Fredericksfield had a population of 219 people.

In the 2021 census, Fredericksfield had a population of 259 people.

== Education ==
There are no schools in Fredericksfield. The nearest government primary schools are Osborne State School in neighbouring Osborne to the north-west and Home Hill State School in neighbouring Home Hill to the north. The nearest government secondary school is Home Hill State High School, also in Home Hill.

== Amenities ==
Despite the name, Home Hill Golf Club is 135 Iona Road, Fredericksfield (19.6892°S 147.4064°E). It is a 9-hole course.
