= Donald Nicklin =

Australian chemical engineer and academic

Donald Nicklin AO (1934-2007) was an Australian chemical engineer and academic.

== Early life ==
Donald James Nicklin was born 20 December 1934 in Home Hill, Queensland. His father, James Nicklin was a mechanical and electrical engineer who worked at a number of sugar mills. His grandfather, Reuben Nicklin was a merchant in the Coorparoo area. His cousin George Frances Reuben Nicklin was a Premier of Queensland. Donald Nicklin attended Buranda Boys State School and Brisbane Grammar School, where he was Dux in his final year. He won a scholarship to attend the University of Queensland in 1952 and graduated with his Bachelor of Applied Science degree with First Class Honours in Industrial Chemistry in 1957. Nicklin also won a University Gold Medal in the same year. He completed a Bachelor of Science (Mathematics) degree in 1959. Nicklin won a Shell Scholarship to undertake studies towards a PhD in chemical engineering from the University of Cambridge in 1961. He won the Junior Moulton Medal from the Institution of Chemical Engineers. Nicklin commenced work with the DuPont company in Canada following graduation from Cambridge.

== Career ==
Nicklin moved to the U.S. branch of the DuPont group and worked on the group that developed Lycra, undertaking analyses of the process of spinning the fabric. He returned to Australia in 1965, where he was appointed Senior Lecturer in the Department of Chemical Engineering at the University of Queensland. He was appointed Professor in 1969 and was Head of the Department from 1969-1980. One of Nicklin’s students, Andrew Liveris, would also pursue a career with the DuPont company. Nicklin took his Bachelor of Economics degree from UQ in 1973. He was Dean of the Faculty of Engineering between 1976-1979. He was Pro Vice Chancellor for Physical Sciences between 1983-1992. He retired from the university in 1993 and continued his work in industry and academia for many subsequent years.

He published over 50 papers and several patents.

== Personal life ==
Nicklin died after a short illness on 29 October 2007. He married occupational therapist Joanna Wilson of Sydney in 1958 and they had six children.

== Awards and memberships ==
Fellow of the Australian Academy of Technological Sciences and Engineering

1987 - Chemeca medal from the Chemical College of the Institution of Engineers, Australia

Member - Prime Minister’s Science, Engineering and Innovation Council – 6 years

Member – AusIndustry’s Industry Research and Development Board

Chair, Centre for Mining Technology and Equipment

Director, Ticor

Chair, Austa Energy Corporation

Chair, Board of Trustees, Brisbane Grammar School

Member, Sugar Research Institute

Officer of the Order of Australia, 1996

== Legacy ==
The Institution of Chemical Engineers created a Nicklin Medal in his honour in 2008. A building was named in his honour at UQ.
