= Swans Lagoon, Queensland =

Swans Lagoon
- Suburb
- Interactive map of Swans Lagoon
- Coordinates: 20.1019°S 147.1605°E
- Country: Australia
- State: Queensland
- LGA: Shire of Burdekin
- Location: 23.1 km (14.4 mi) SW of Millaroo; 83.7 km (52.0 mi) SW of Ayr; 122 km (76 mi) SSW of Townsville; 1,330 km (830 mi) NNW of Brisbane

Government
  - State electorate: Burdekin
  - Federal division: Kennedy

Area
  - Total: 468.9 km^{2} (181.0 sq mi)

Population
  - Total: 12 (2021 census)
  - Density: 0.0256/km^{2} (0.0663/sq mi)
- Time zone: UTC+10:00 (AEST)
- Postcode: 4807
Suburbs around Swans Lagoon
Mulgrave	Mulgrave	Millaroo
Mulgrave	Swans Lagoon	Millaroo
Ravenswood	Eight Mile Creek	Dalbeg

Swans Lagoon is a rural locality in the Shire of Burdekin, Queensland, Australia. In the 2021 census, Swans Lagoon had a population of 12 people.

== Geography ==
Swans Lagoon has the following mountain features:

- Mount Dalrymple at the north of the locality (19.95°S 147.1833°E) 579 metres (1,900 ft)
- Mcgregors Bonnet, a mountain at the centre of the locality (20.1153°S 147.1608°E) 327 metres (1,073 ft)
- Expedition Pass in the south-west of the locality (20.2°S 147.1°E)

The land use is predominantly grazing on native vegetation.

== History ==
The locality was named and bounded on 23 February 2001. It presumably takes its name from the waterhole of the same name (20.12098°S 147.25875°E). The waterhole is named after a postman with surname Swan who often camped by the lagoon.

The Queensland Government purchased an 80 square kilometres (31 sq mi) pastoral property called Swan's Lagoon in 1961 to establish a beef cattle research station. In 1978, the purchase of an adjacent pastoral property expanded the research station to 340 square kilometres (130 sq mi). The research centre investigated problems relating to raising beef cattle in northern Australia, where cattle production is affected by inconsistent rainfalls, viruses and parasites. The research station was sold in 2014, when the Queensland Government decided to transfer the research program to its Spyglass beef research facility at Basalt, north of Charters Towers.

== Demographics ==
In the 2016 census, Swans Lagoon had "no people or a very low population".

In the 2021 census, Swans Lagoon had a population of 12 people.

== Education ==
There are no schools in Swans Lagoon. The nearest government primary school is Millaroo State School in neighbouring Millaroo to the east. There are no nearby secondary schools. The alternatives are distance education and boarding school.
