= Burdekin Bridge =

Road and rail bridge in Queensland, Australia

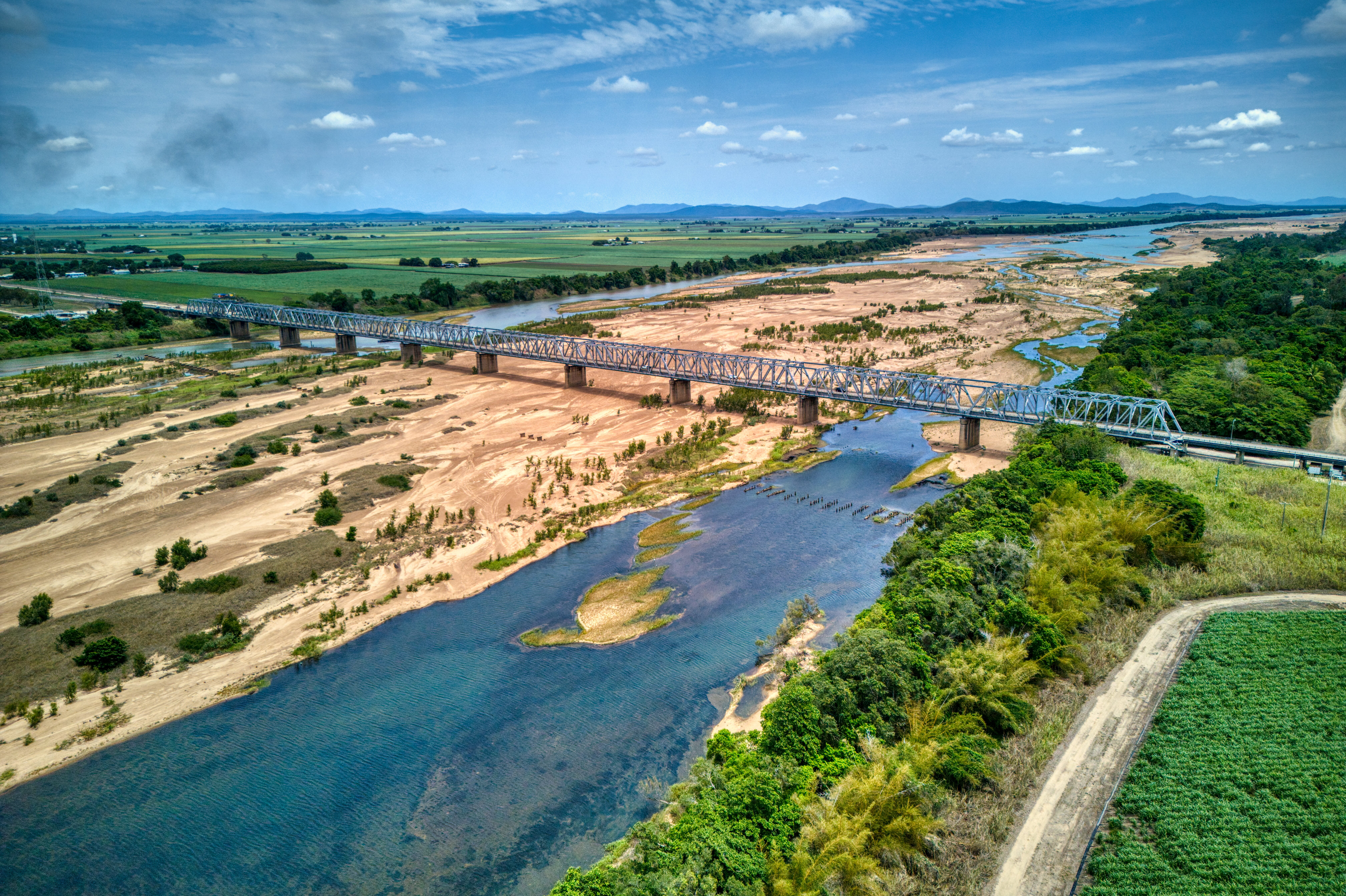
- Burdekin Bridge
- Coordinates: 19.6404°S 147.3946°E
- Carries: Bruce Highway (motor vehicles, railway)
- Crosses: Burdekin River
- Locale: between the towns of Ayr and Home Hill, Queensland, Australia
- Other name: Burdekin River Bridge or the Silver Link
- Preceded by: Inkerman Bridge

Characteristics
- Design: Truss bridge
- Material: Steel
- Total length: Total: 3,620 feet (1,103 m); Main spans: 2,500 feet (762.0 m); Approaches: 3 + 8
- Longest span: 250 feet (76.2 m)
- No. of spans: 10 main spans and 22 approach spans
- Piers in water: 9

History
- Designer: Harry Lowe, Noel Ullman, Bill Hansen
- Construction start: April 1947
- Construction end: 1957
- Opened: 27 March 1957

Statistics
- Daily traffic: 7000
- Toll: No

Location
- Interactive map of Burdekin Bridge

The Burdekin Bridge (known as the Burdekin River Bridge or Silver Link) spans the Burdekin River between the towns of Ayr (locality of McDesme) to the north and Home Hill to the south, both in the Shire of Burdekin, Queensland, Australia. Located on the Bruce Highway which is part of Highway 1, it is an important link in the national road network. It is a road-rail bridge which provides high flood immunity link between north and south Queensland.

The Bridge was completed in 1957. Construction began 10 years earlier in 1947. At 3,620 feet (1,103 m) in length, it is one of the longest multi-span bridges in Australia and longer than Brisbane's Story Bridge or New South Wales's Hawkesbury River Railway Bridge. It is 46 metres shorter than Sydney's Harbour Bridge. It is the only bridge in Australia to be built on sand.

== History ==
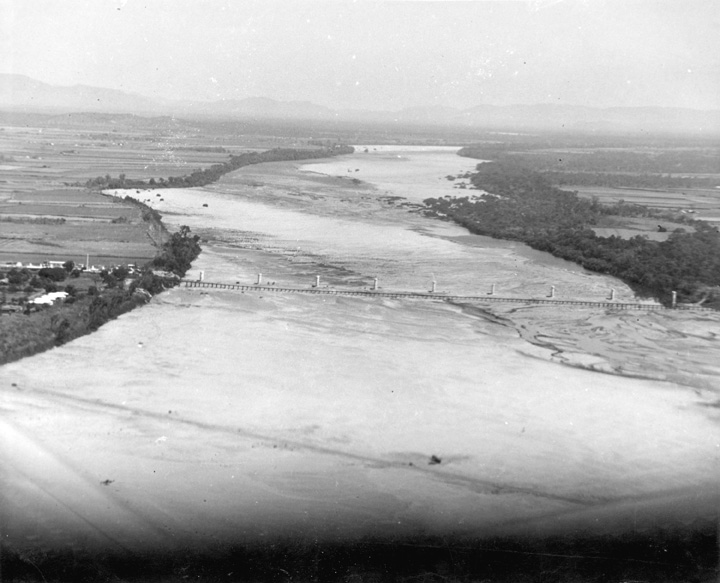
Aerial photograph of Burdekin Bridge construction site showing piers with Railway Bridge in foreground c 1952

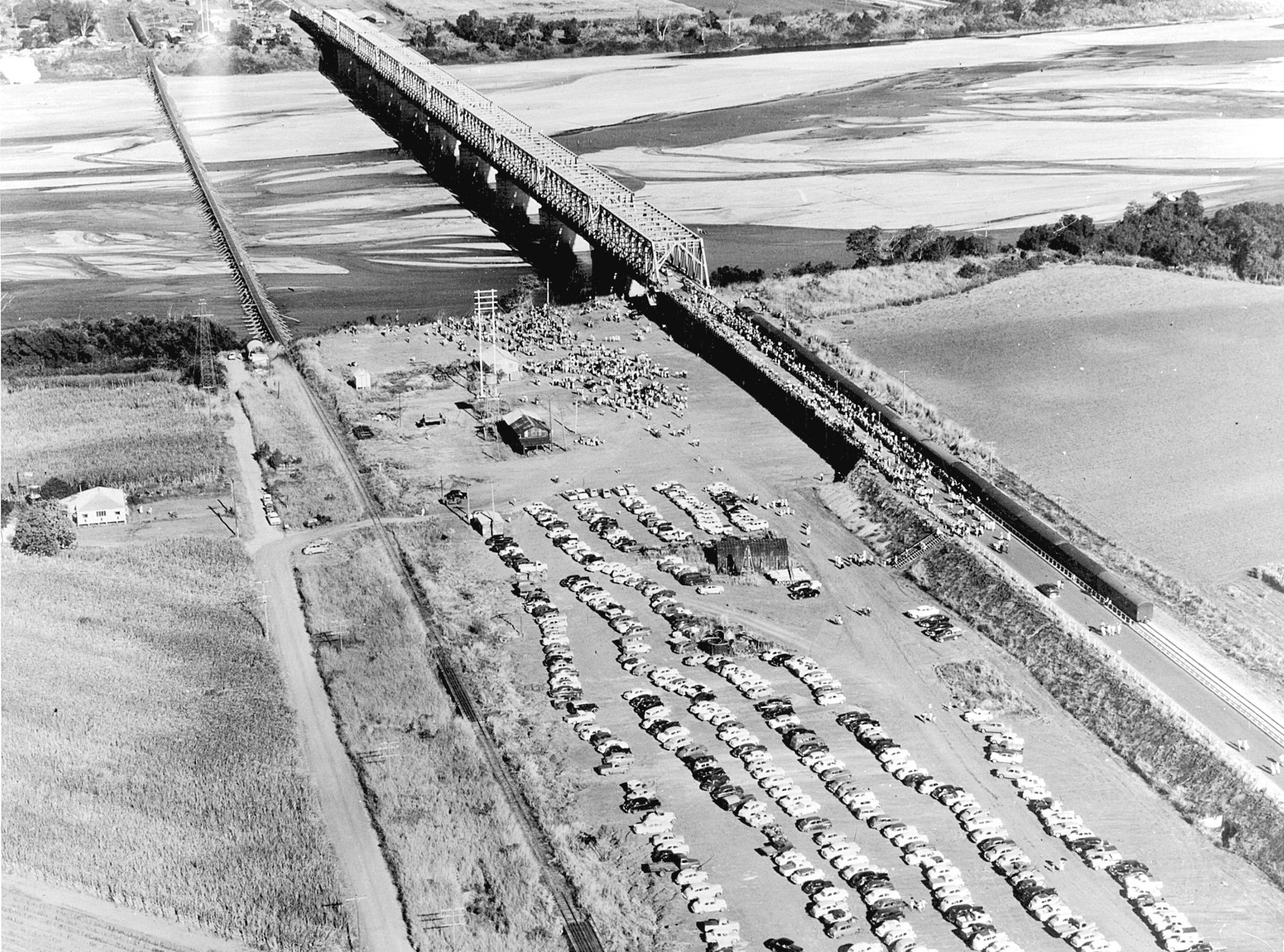
Official opening of Burdekin Bridge, 15 June 1957, as seen from the Ayr/McDesme side of the river

Prior to the construction of the high-level Burdekin Bridge, there were two low-level bridges over the Burdekin River, one for road and one for rail. These bridges were frequently impassable due to flooding of the river. Remnants of the old rail bridge can be seen immediately downstream of the present bridge.

Originally, it was thought that the bridge could not be built in its present location. No trace of rock could be found on which to build the bridge foundations. In 1946, two high-ranking Government engineers visited India to inspect a number of bridges built on sand foundations. The same technique was used for the Burdekin Bridge and it is the only bridge in Australia not built with a firm foothold.

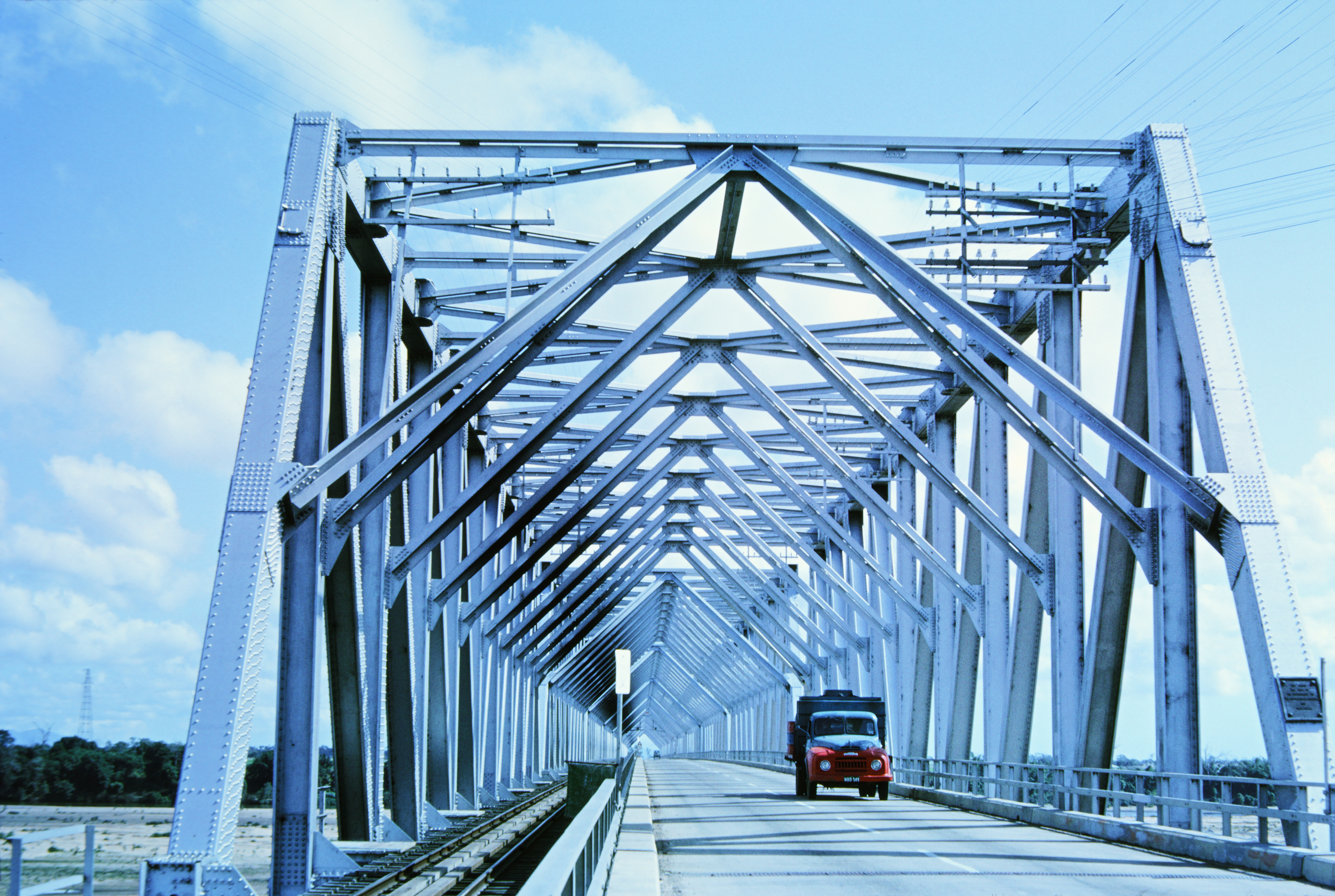
Rail and road sections from the Home Hill side, 1963

The bridge rests on 11 huge, hollow, concrete caissons sunk into the river bed. The caissons are 17 metres across the top (measured parallel to the stream) and vary in width from 5.5 to 7.6 metres. The caissons were sunk into the river bed to a depth of about 30 metres. Add to that the approximately 20 metres that the caissons rise above the bed and the result is some very massive pieces of concrete. Each weighs about 4,000 tons. The caissons were fitted with steel "cutting edges" to help them sink. The steel used in the cutting edges weighed 238 tons.

Construction of the first caisson started in 1947 after the "wet season". As each caisson rose in height, sand was removed from the centre of the caisson to make it sink into the sand bed. To get such a tremendous mass to sink gradually and evenly was difficult. To add to the difficulties, often a caisson became stuck and a diver had to be sent down to find the problem and remedy it. Another difficulty was that each caisson had to be sunk to a secure depth before the "wet season". If a caisson was not firmly anchored deep enough, a flood could have swept it away.

Because the bridge does not have rock foundations but is entirely supported by sand, it is sometimes described as a floating bridge. It is not a true floating bridge as it does not float on water.

The metal bridge spans were bolted together with high-tensile bolts instead of being riveted. At the time, no other Australian bridge had ever been constructed this way.

With all the difficulties, plus the shortage of steel after World War II, the construction took almost a decade to complete at a cost of $6 million. The bridge officially opened on 27 March 1957. Despite these setbacks, the new bridge greatly assisted in travel between Ayr, Queensland and Home Hill, Queensland and formed a vital link between North and South Queensland.

The Silver Link replaced the Inkerman Bridge which is set just above the river bed. It was regularly covered and washed away by flood waters but it is still possible to see the remains of the old bridge when the river level is low.

Due to the special construction of the bridge, with steel beams forming a truss over the highway, it is regularly being closed to let pass oversize loads which take both lanes on the narrow bridge.

In October 2010, the Burdekin Bridge was recognised as a National Engineering Heritage Landmark.

A 5-year bridge maintenance and rehabilitation project had commenced in 2013. It is the first major structural rehabilitation work undertaken since the bridge construction. This maintenance and rehabilitation program is continuing in July 2022, with an expected total cost of $96.9 million.

== Engineering heritage ==
The bridge was listed as an Engineering Heritage National Landmark by Engineers Australia as part of its Engineering Heritage Recognition Program.

== See also ==
- List of road-rail bridges
