= 2016 Home Hill stabbings =

Stabbing attack in Home Hill, Queensland, Australia

- Location: 19.661974°S 147.414460°E; 30 Ninth Ave, Home Hill, Queensland, Australia
- Date: 23 August 2016; 11:15 pm AEST (UTC+10:00)
- Attack type: Mass stabbing
- Deaths: 2
- Injuries: 1
- Perpetrator: Smail Ayad

On 23 August 2016, Smail Ayad, a 29-year-old French national, carried out a stabbing attack at a backpackers' hostel in Home Hill, Queensland, Australia. The attack caused the death of two people and a dog, and left one person injured.

It was alleged that Ayad used the Arabic phrase "Allahu akbar" both during the attack and his arrest, and while police had ruled out any links to extremism, they were still investigating whether he had a romantic interest in victim Mia Ayliffe-Chung. Police have indicated Ayad had used cannabis on the night of the attack. He also sang the French national anthem during the attack.

On 25 August 2016, Ayad was charged with the crimes of murder, attempted murder, serious animal cruelty and serious assault. On 27 October 2016, Ayad's trial was adjourned to Mental Health Court, as a result of determining a preliminary diagnosis of schizophrenia. This diagnosis was confirmed by the Mental Health Court on 5 April 2018, resulting in the criminal charges being dropped and an order was made to detain him in The Park Centre for Mental Health in Brisbane for treatment.

== Attack ==
Ayad attacked Mia Ayliffe-Chung, his roommate at the hostel, as she lay in her bunk. Armed with a large knife, he her from her bed and out onto a balcony. He held the knife to her throat and told other guests who had now gathered to leave the area. On hearing the commotion, the hostel manager, Grant Scholz, appeared on the balcony and began to approach Ayad. Another guest arrived and pleaded with him to drop the weapon. Ayad inflicted a wound to Ayliffe-Chung and, after she fell to the floor, he continued to assault her with the knife. Scholz attempted to reach Ayliffe-Chung but was wounded in the leg by Ayad. Ayliffe-Chung got to her feet and ran down a corridor towards the safety of a bathroom. She was followed by another guest who had called 000. Without thinking of his own safety, British backpacker Tom Jackson ran upstairs to the bathroom to assist Ayliffe-Chung. After applying pressure to her substantial wounds, Jackson and the other man began to move her from the cubicle and out of the bathroom. On opening the door to the bathroom, Jackson was confronted by Ayad. He attempted to close the door, but Ayad kicked it open and entered the bathroom. Ayad began to assault Jackson with the knife, inflicting severe wounds. The other guest quickly left the bathroom, yelling for assistance. Ayad then chased the hostel's 10-year-old pet German shepherd, Atari, around the yard stabbing the dog until it died. Tom Jackson died in hospital several days later. Ayad continued to scream "Allahu akbar" as police officers worked to subdue him and threatened to taser him, injuring several officers. Jackson and another guest, Daniel Richards, were subsequently awarded the Queen's Gallantry Medal for their efforts to aid Ayliffe-Chung. Moreover, on 24 March 2021, Tom Jackson was also honored posthumously with the Star of Courage, one of Australia's highest bravery awards, for displaying extraordinary selflessness during the attack.

== Victims ==
Both Ayliffe-Chung and the dog Atari died at the scene. Jackson suffered critical injuries in the attack, as he had been stabbed in one of his eyes and his brain, and died five days later in hospital. Grant Scholz, the manager at the hostel, suffered serious stab wounds to the leg.

== Attacker ==
Smail Ayad, who was 29 at the time of the murders, is a French national. Ayad went out drinking once a week, like many backpackers, where on Saturday nights he would travel to Ayr for rum or beer with other Frenchmen.

Since his arrest, he has been transferred from Stuart prison to a secure mental health facility in Brisbane.

Ayad was initially charged with Ayliffe-Chung's murder, the attempted murders of Jackson and Scholz, and a charge of animal cruelty. An additional 12 counts of assaulting police were laid a few days later arising from his attack on the police officers who had subdued him. One of the attempted murder charges was upgraded to murder after Jackson died.

On 5 April 2018, the Queensland Mental Health Court determined that Ayad was of unsound mind at the time of the killings. Four psychiatrists found he had paranoid schizophrenia whilst believing he was the target of an international conspiracy to kill him. As a result, the criminal charges were dropped against Ayad as it could not be proven he had an intent to kill. The court directed Ayad to be detained in The Park Centre for Mental Health for treatment.

On 1 July 2020, coroner Nerida Wilson confirmed the preliminary findings, but also told that an inquest would be useless, since it only could come to exactly the same conclusion.

In early 2021, Ayad was deported to France, at which time he was placed at a psychiatric health facility.

== Responses ==
The Islamic Council of Queensland criticised media reports for quickly linking use of this phrase with Islamic terrorism. On 25 August 2016, the authorities were confident the stabbings were not an act of terrorism. Several backpackers who have stayed at Home Hill before the double murder spoke out against the violence that had broken out previously and the drinking culture among the backpackers. The town was called "Hell Hill" even before the murder incident and one former resident warned others to "avoid it at all costs". Ayliffe-Chung's mother, Rosie Ayliffe, came to Australia for her daughter's cremation and began to investigate working conditions on Australian farms.
