= Clare, Queensland =

Clare
- Town
- Interactive map of Clare
- Coordinates: 19.7847°S 147.2272°E
- Country: Australia
- State: Queensland
- LGA: Shire of Burdekin
- Location: 30.3 km (18.8 mi) SW of Home Hill; 34.4 km (21.4 mi) SW of Ayr; 89.0 km (55.3 mi) SE of Townsville; 1,269 km (789 mi) NNW of Brisbane

Government
  - State electorate: Burdekin
  - Federal division: Dawson

Area
  - Total: 114.7 km^{2} (44.3 sq mi)

Population
  - Total: 201 (2021 census)
  - Density: 1.752/km^{2} (4.539/sq mi)
- Time zone: UTC+10:00 (AEST)
- Postcode: 4807
Localities around Clare
Upper Haughton	Upper Haughton	Mona Park
Mulgrave	Clare	Kirknie
Mulgrave	Kirknie	Kirknie

Clare is a rural town and locality in the Shire of Burdekin, Queensland, Australia. In the 2021 census, the locality of Clare had a population of 201 people.

== Geography ==
Clare is low-lying flat land (approx 20 metres about sea level). The Burdekin River forms the locality's eastern boundary. The land is used to grow sugarcane growing area and there is a network of cane tramways to transport the harvested sugarcane to the local sugar mills. The town is located in the east of the locality, near but not beside the river.

The Clare Solar Farm is on Shadforth Road (19.8411°S 147.2056°E).

== History ==
The town was originally named Mulgrave, but was changed by Surveyor-General to Clare on 20 July 1882.

A Burdekin receiving office was open by 1879. It was renamed Culburra in 1880. It became Mulgrave Post Office later that year, then Clare Post Office in 1882. It had closed by 1916.

Clare State School opened on 8 February 1950. At the school, a time capsule can be located at the front gates - it is scheduled to be opened in 2025.

The Clare Solar Farm was established in 2018.

== Demographics ==
In the 2006 census, the locality of Clare had a population of 410 people.

In the 2016 census, the locality of Clare had a population of 196 people.

In the 2021 census, the locality of Clare had a population of 201 people.

== Education ==
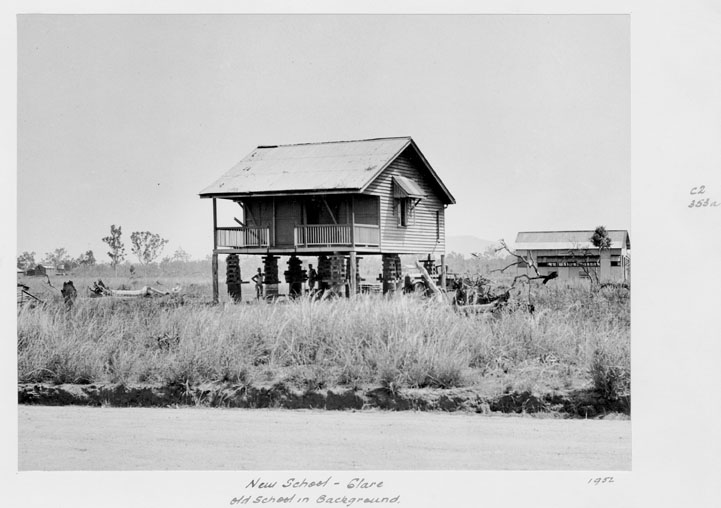
Clare State School with old school in the background, circa 1952

Clare State School is a government primary (Prep-6) school for boys and girls on Larkin Street (19.7832°S 147.2268°E). In 2016, the school had an enrolment of 23 students with 2 teachers and 5 non-teaching staff (2 full-time equivalent). In 2018, the school had an enrolment of 19 students with 2 teachers (1 full-time equivalent) and 6 non-teaching staff (3 full-time equivalent).

There are no secondary schools in Clare. The nearest government secondary school is Home Hill State High School in Home Hill to the north-east.

== Amenity ==
The Clare post office is at 18 George Road (19.7843°S 147.2283°E).
