= Millaroo, Queensland =

Millaroo
- Town
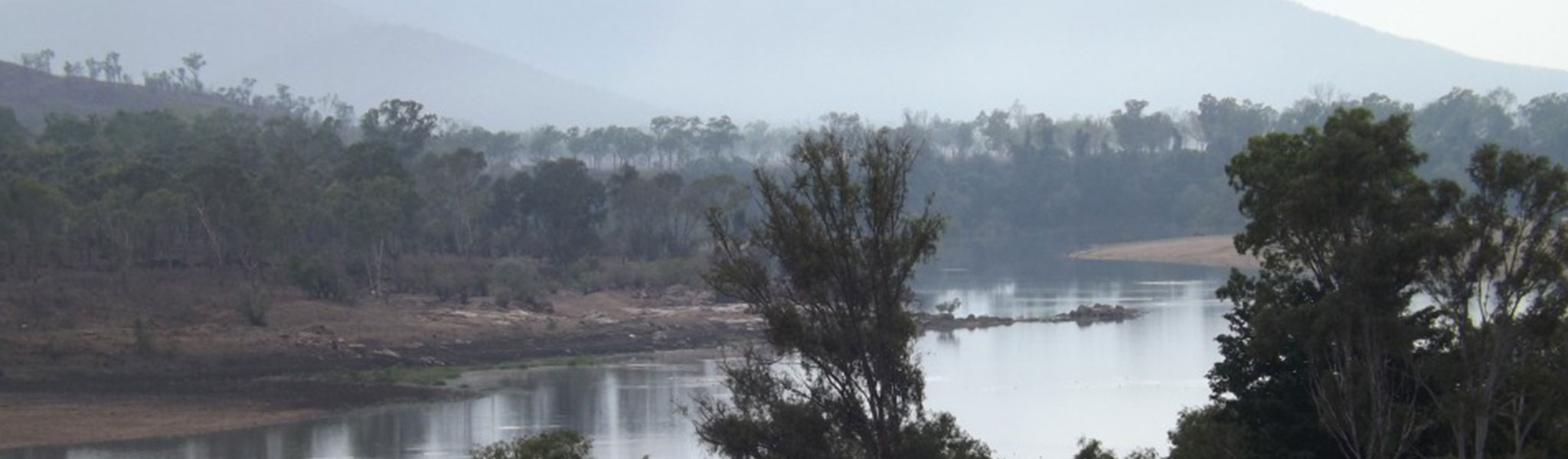
- Burdekin River at Millaroo

- Interactive map of Millaroo
- Coordinates: 20.0569°S 147.28°E
- Country: Australia
- State: Queensland
- LGA: Shire of Burdekin
- Location: 64.5 km (40.1 mi) SW of Home Hill; 67.6 km (42.0 mi) SW of Ayr; 121 km (75 mi) SSE of Townsville; 1,304 km (810 mi) NNW of Brisbane

Government
  - State electorate: Burdekin
  - Federal division: Kennedy

Area
  - Total: 57.7 km^{2} (22.3 sq mi)
- Elevation: 50 m (160 ft)

Population
  - Total: 86 (2021 census)
  - Density: 1.490/km^{2} (3.860/sq mi)
- Time zone: UTC+10:00 (AEST)
- Postcode: 4807
- Mean max temp: 30.2 °C (86.4 °F)
- Mean min temp: 17.0 °C (62.6 °F)
- Annual rainfall: 843.3 mm (33.20 in)
Localities around Millaroo
Mulgrave	Kirknie	Kirknie
Swans Lagoon	Millaroo	Bogie
Swans Lagoon	Dalbeg	Bogie

Millaroo is a rural town and locality in the Shire of Burdekin, Queensland, Australia. In the 2021 census, the locality of Millaroo had a population of 86 people.

== Geography ==
The locality is bounded to the west by the Burdekin River. The place is located about 100 kilometres (62 mi) south-east of Townsville, about 50 kilometres (31 mi) inland from the Coral Sea.

It is a sugarcane growing area with underground water supplies to irrigate crops.

=== Climate ===
Millaroo has a dry-winter humid subtropical climate, bordering on a tropical savannah climate (Köppen: Cwa/Aw). The town experiences a short wet season from December to March and a long dry season from April to October with cooler nights and higher sunshine. Average maxima vary from 33.4 °C (92.1 °F) in November and December to 25.5 °C (77.9 °F) in July, while average minima fluctuate between 22.6 °C (72.7 °F) in January and 9.9 °C (49.8 °F) in July. Mean average annual precipitation is moderate: 843.3 mm (33.20 in); but is highly concentrated during the summer; and is spread across 57.2 precipitation days (above the 1.0 mm (0.039 in) threshold). Extreme temperatures have ranged from 44.4 °C (111.9 °F) on 13 February 1969 to −0.7 °C (30.7 °F) on 24 June 1984.

Climate data for Millaroo (20º03'00"S, 147º16'12"E, 45 m AMSL) (1965-1993 normals and extremes, rainfall to 1958)
Month	Jan	Feb	Mar	Apr	May	Jun	Jul	Aug	Sep	Oct	Nov	Dec	Year
Record high °C (°F)	42.2 (108.0)	44.4 (111.9)	39.7 (103.5)	36.5 (97.7)	33.0 (91.4)	32.2 (90.0)	31.0 (87.8)	36.4 (97.5)	37.5 (99.5)	38.7 (101.7)	43.7 (110.7)	42.0 (107.6)	44.4 (111.9)
Mean daily maximum °C (°F)	33.1 (91.6)	32.5 (90.5)	31.7 (89.1)	30.2 (86.4)	27.9 (82.2)	25.8 (78.4)	25.5 (77.9)	27.5 (81.5)	29.8 (85.6)	31.8 (89.2)	33.4 (92.1)	33.4 (92.1)	30.2 (86.4)
Mean daily minimum °C (°F)	22.6 (72.7)	22.4 (72.3)	20.9 (69.6)	17.9 (64.2)	15.0 (59.0)	11.0 (51.8)	9.9 (49.8)	11.6 (52.9)	13.8 (56.8)	16.9 (62.4)	20.3 (68.5)	21.8 (71.2)	17.0 (62.6)
Record low °C (°F)	15.7 (60.3)	17.0 (62.6)	13.2 (55.8)	8.3 (46.9)	3.3 (37.9)	−0.7 (30.7)	0.0 (32.0)	0.5 (32.9)	4.0 (39.2)	8.9 (48.0)	12.7 (54.9)	14.4 (57.9)	−0.7 (30.7)
Average precipitation mm (inches)	190.7 (7.51)	168.8 (6.65)	128.5 (5.06)	48.9 (1.93)	45.9 (1.81)	20.4 (0.80)	15.7 (0.62)	10.4 (0.41)	8.5 (0.33)	25.6 (1.01)	55.0 (2.17)	127.4 (5.02)	843.3 (33.20)
Average precipitation days (≥ 1.0 mm)	9.4	10.3	8.3	4.6	3.7	2.1	1.8	1.4	1.1	2.7	4.6	7.2	57.2
Mean monthly sunshine hours	229.4	200.6	220.1	222.0	223.2	234.0	251.1	266.6	273.0	297.6	285.0	257.3	2,959.9
Percentage possible sunshine	56	56	58	64	64	71	73	75	76	76	73	62	67
Source: Bureau of Meteorology (1965-1993 normals and extremes, rainfall to 1958)

== History ==
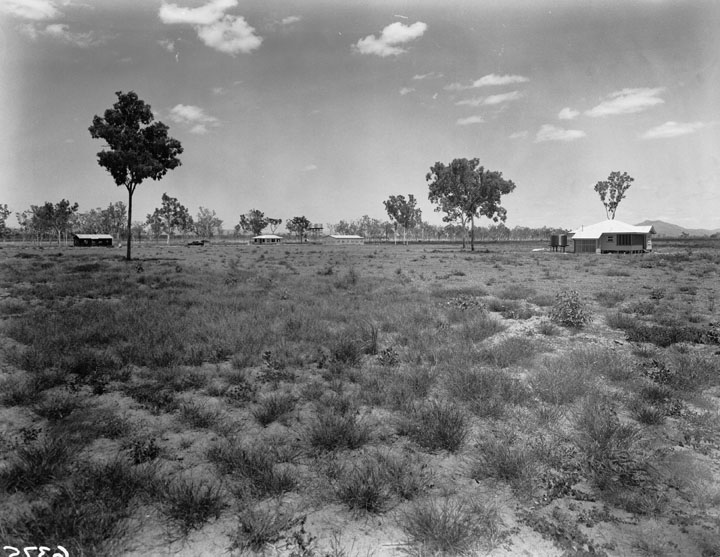
Millaroo Experiment Station buildings under construction, November 1955

The name Millaroo comes from Millaroo Creek, which in turn was recorded by surveyor Robert Abbott in 1895, but the original of that name are unknown. There was a pastoral property of that name.

Following World War II, a number of soldier settlement blocks were established in the area for the purpose of growing tobacco, but it was not successful.

In 1952, there was a plan to establish a new irrigation area along the Burdekin River based around a new town. The town to be called Millaroo was to be established as a "modern" "first class" planned town with reserves, parks, and industrial zones suitable for a population of 6,000 (a similar population to that of Ayr at that time). The buildings were to be constructed with brick and concrete to reduce the fire risk.

In 1952, the Millaroo Research Station was established by the Queensland Department of Agriculture and Stock to undertake agricultural research to benefit North Queensland.

The Burdekin Gorge Weir (20.4726°S 147.2905°E) on the Burdekin River (between Ravenswood and Mount Wyatt) was completed in November 1953 to provide water for irrigation. This led to the land at Millaroo switching to growing sugarcane.

Millaroo State School opened on 19 July 1954.

Millaroo Post Office opened on 1 July 1955 and closed in 1972.

== Demographics ==
In the 2011 census, the locality of Millaroo had a population of 200 people.

In the 2016 census, the locality of Millaroo had a population of 96 people.

In the 2021 census, the locality of Millaroo had a population of 86 people.

== Education ==
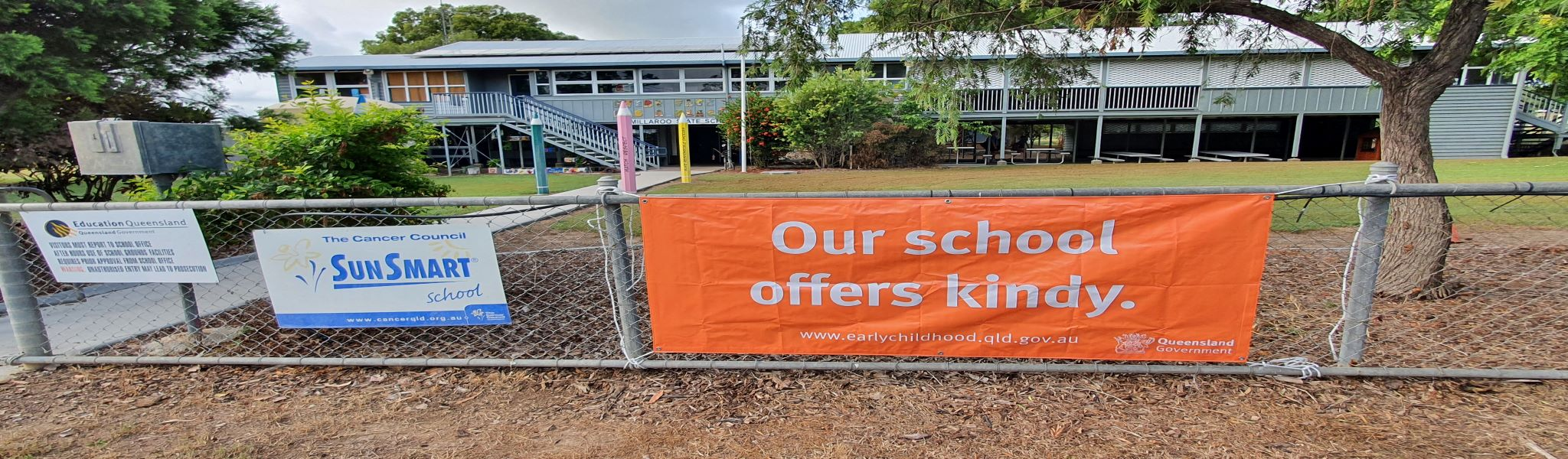
Millaroo State School

Millaroo State School is a government primary (Early Childhood-6) school for boys and girls at 1-13 Cunningham Street (20.0581°S 147.2806°E). In 2018, the school had an enrolment of 9 students with 3 teachers (2 full-time equivalent) and 6 non-teaching staff (2 full-time equivalent).

There are no secondary schools in Millaroo. The nearest government secondary school is Home Hill State High School in Home Hill to the north-east, but, given the distance, the alternatives are distance education or boarding schools.
