= Osborne, Queensland =

Locality in the Shire of Burdekin, Australia

Osborne
- Suburb
- Interactive map of Osborne
- Coordinates: 19.6948°S 147.3569°E
- Country: Australia
- State: Queensland
- LGA: Shire of Burdekin
- Location: 10.5 km (6.5 mi) SW of Home Hill; 18.1 km (11.2 mi) SSW of Ayr; 104 km (65 mi) SE of Townsville; 1,353 km (841 mi) NNW of Brisbane

Government
  - State electorate: Burdekin
  - Federal division: Dawson

Area
  - Total: 49.0 km^{2} (18.9 sq mi)

Population
  - Total: 245 (2021 census)
  - Density: 5.000/km^{2} (12.95/sq mi)
- Time zone: UTC+10:00 (AEST)
- Postcode: 4806
Suburbs around Osborne
Mount Kelly	Airville	Home Hill
Mount Kelly	Osborne	Fredericksfield
Kirknie	Fredericksfield	Fredericksfield

Osborne is a rural locality in the Shire of Burdekin, Queensland, Australia. In the 2021 census, Osborne had a population of 245 people.

== Geography ==
Osborne is low flat land (under 10 metres above sea level) bounded to the north by the Burdekin River.

The predominant land use is growing sugarcane. There is a cane tramway network to transport the harvested sugarcane to the local sugar mills.

== History ==
Osborne State School opened on 7 December 1914.

Iona State School opened on 13 August 28 and closed on 23 June 1963. It was located on the north-west corner of Iona Road and Bapty Road (approx 19.7121°S 147.4025°E).

== Demographics ==
In the 2016 census, Osborne had a population of 273 people.

In the 2021 census, Osborne had a population of 245 people.

== Education ==
Osborne State School is a government primary (Prep-6) school for boys and girls at Kirknie Road (19.7005°S 147.3466°E). In 2016, the school had an enrolment of 15 students with 2 teachers (1 full-time equivalent) and 5 non-teaching staff (2 full-time equivalent). In 2018, the school had an enrolment of 13 students with 3 teachers (2 full-time equivalent) and 2 non-teaching staff (1 full-time equivalent).

There are no secondary schools in Osborne. The nearest government secondary school is Home Hill State High School in neighbouring Home Hill to the east.
