= Home Hill, Queensland =

Town in Australia

Home Hill
- Town
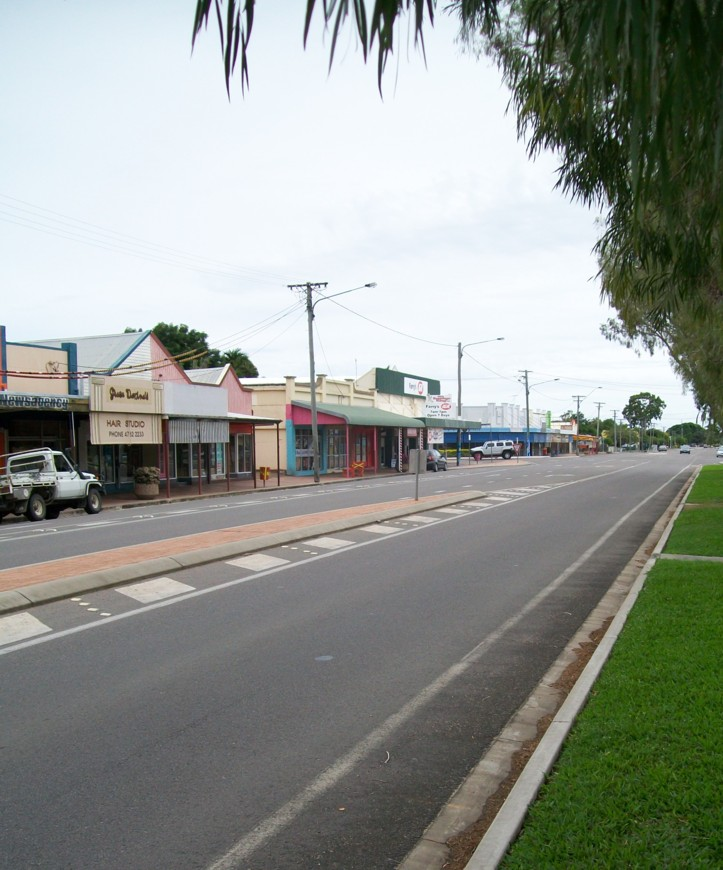
- View of Home Hill's main street, along the Bruce Highway

- Interactive map of Home Hill
- Coordinates: 19.6608°S 147.4141°E
- Country: Australia
- State: Queensland
- LGA: Shire of Burdekin
- Location: 12.3 km (7.6 mi) S of Ayr; 97 km (60 mi) SE of Townsville; 1,245 km (774 mi) NNW of Brisbane
- Established: 1912

Government
  - State electorate: Burdekin
  - Federal division: Dawson

Area
  - Total: 20.2 km^{2} (7.8 sq mi)

Population
  - Total: 2,876 (2021 census)
  - Density: 142.4/km^{2} (368.8/sq mi)
- Time zone: UTC+10:00 (AEST)
- Postcode: 4806
Localities around Home Hill
Airville	McDesme	McDesme
Osborne	Home Hill	Carstairs
Osborne	Fredericksfield	Inkerman

Home Hill is a rural town and locality in the Shire of Burdekin, Queensland, Australia. In the 2021 census, the locality of Home Hill had a population of 2,876 people.

At the delta of the Burdekin River, it is a sugarcane growing area with underground water supplies to irrigate crops.

Badilla is a neighbourhood in the south of the locality (19.6817°S 147.4233°E).

== Geography ==
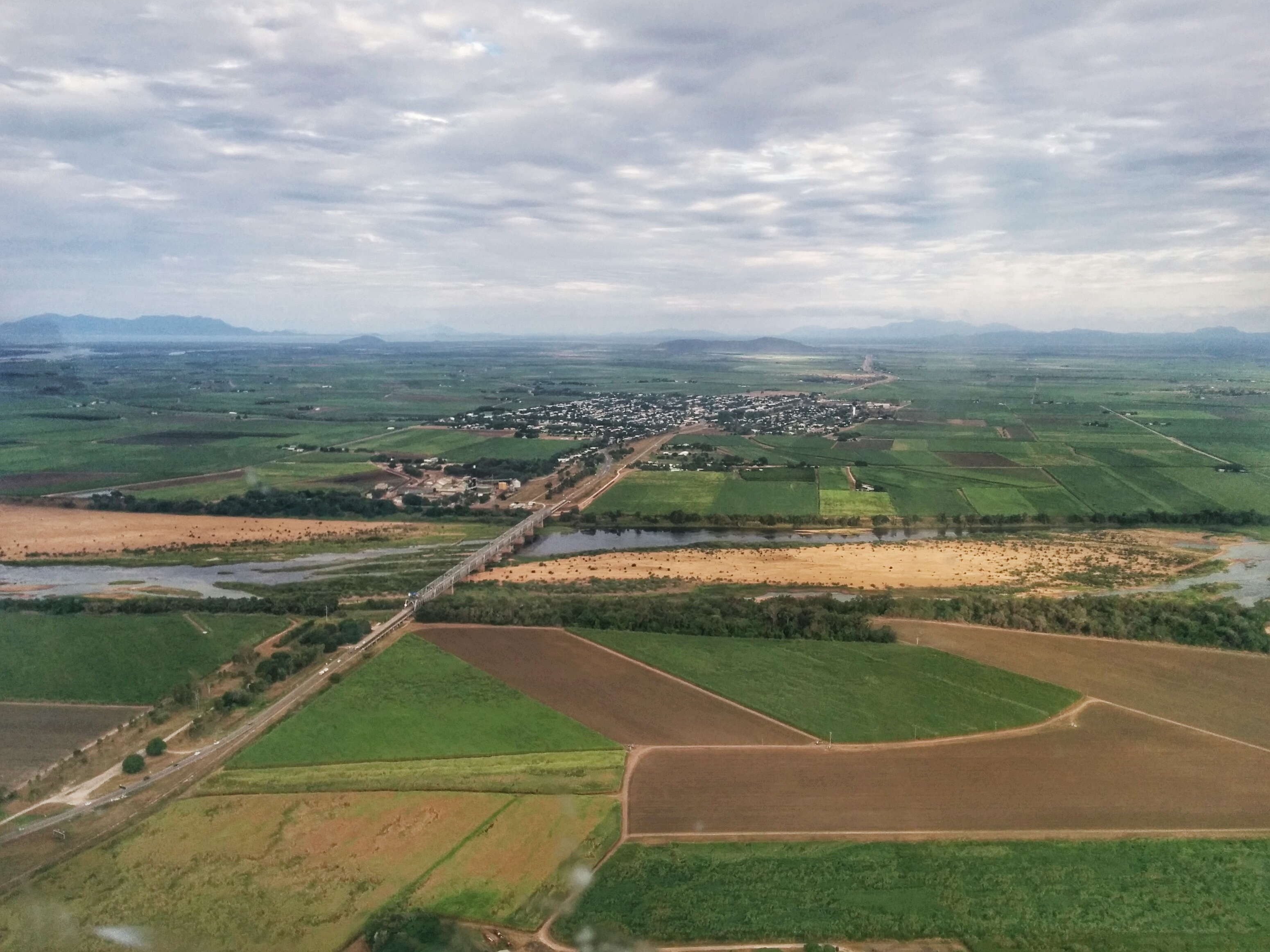
Aerial view of Home Hill, looking south

Home Hill lies approximately 98 kilometres (61 mi) south of Townsville and 1,269 kilometres (789 mi) north of the state capital Brisbane on the Bruce Highway. It is a part of the Shire of Burdekin which includes the town of Ayr to the north. Both towns are governed by the Burdekin Shire Council.

The Burdekin River forms the locality's north-western boundary. The town is situated centrally within the locality surrounded by crop farming. The Bruce Highway passes through the town from the south-east (Fredericksfield / Inkerman) to the north-west crossing the river via the Burdekin Bridge to McDesme en route to Ayr.

The North Coast railway line runs immediately parallel and west of the highway, also entering from the south-east (Fredericksfield / Inkerman) and exiting to the north-west (McDesme) via the Burdekin Bridge. There are three railway stations within the locality:

- Carstairs railway station, now abandoned, at the Inkerman Sugar Mill in the north of the locality (19.6453°S 147.4005°E)
- Home Hill railway station in the town centre (19.6656°S 147.4140°E)
- Badilla railway station, now abandoned, in the south of the locality (19.6792°S 147.4218°E)

To the west of the town is Gardiner's Lagoon.

Despite its name, the land in the locality is very flat.

== History ==
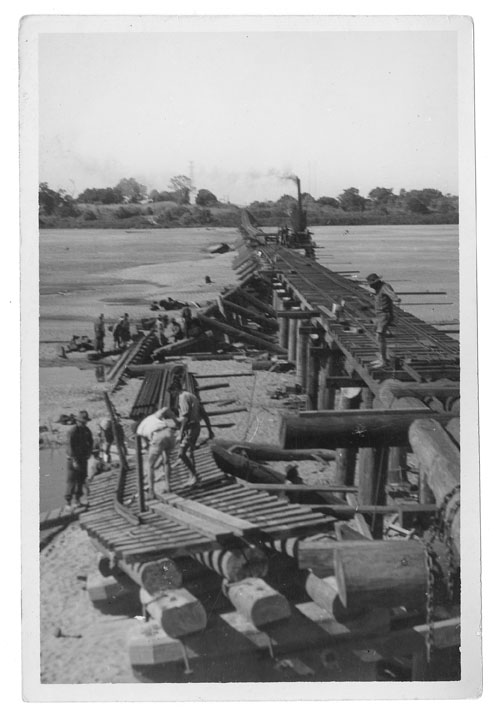
Repairing flood damage to the Burdekin River railway bridge, 29 October 1940

Yuru (also known as Juru, Euronbba, Juru, Mal Mal, Malmal) is an Australian Aboriginal language spoken on Yuru country. The Yuru language region includes the landscape within the local government boundaries of the Shire of Burdekin, including the town of Home Hill.

Home Hill was originally part of the Inkerman Downs Cattle Station. In August 1910, the Inkerman estate was resumed by the Queensland Government under the Closer Settlement Act. It was subdivided into farming allotments. Although the town of Ayr was very close by, there was no bridge across the Burdekin River and hence it was necessary to establish a separate town to support the new farming community. The first blocks of town land were offered for sale in December 1912 under the name of Home Hill.

The origin of the name Home Hill is much disputed. The Queensland Government claims it was named after Home Hill, a hilltop defended by the British Army in the Battle of Inkerman in the Crimean War. However it has also been claimed that it was named after Colonel Home who lived in the district and had fought in the Crimea. Another claim is that the name was originally Holme Hill which was corrupted into Home Hill, possibly by a signwriter painting the name at the railway station. A newspaper report in September 1912 calls the proposed town Holme Hill but also makes the connection with the Battle of Inkerman. There are also numerous early references to the town as Holm Hill. Certainly the Hill part of the name does not relate to the local geography which is quite flat with the nearest hill is about 10 kilometres (6.2 mi) away.

Home Hill Post Office opened by 1913 (a receiving office had been open from 1912). In the 1990s there were rumours that the post office would be closed. However, eventually the decision was made to privatise it in 1997.

A tent school was opened in the district on 23 March 1913 but was replaced by the Inkerman State School on 25 October 1913 which was renamed Home Hill State School on 19 January 1914.

The Inkerman Bridge across the Burdekin River to McDesme officially opened on 8 September 1913. The bridge carried the North Coast railway line. As the nearest road bridge across the river was 37 miles (60 km) upstream, a low-level road bridge was built across the river (19.6283°S 147.4044°E) in 1929 and was completed in January 1930 and within two weeks was 3 feet (0.91 m) under water due to the river flooding. Due to the frequent flooding of the river, the rail and road bridges were often closed or damaged, leading to the decision to build a single higher-level road-and-rail bridge. Due to the lack of rock in the sandy soil to use as foundations, for many years it was not believed possible to build a high-level bridge across the Burdekin River. However, by copying construction techniques used in India for sand-footing bridges, work began on the Burdekin Bridge (also known as the Silver Link) in April 1947 but it was not operational until 27 March 1957. The new bridge was 100 metres (330 ft) upstream of the Inkerman Bridge. The Burdekin Bridge officially opened on 15 June 1957. At 1,097 metres (3,599 ft), the Burdekin Bridge is one of the longest multi-span bridges in Australia and the only one in Australia without a firm footing. Some pylons of the Inkerman Bridge are still visible.

The farming allocations were taken up to grow sugar cane and the town developed quite quickly after the establishment of the Inkerman sugar mill in 1914.

The earliest recorded burials in Home Hill cemetery were in 1917. In 2007 a lawn cemetery section was added.

In 1922, a power station was built enabling electricity to be supplied for the first time in Home Hill.

In 1923, the first courthouse in Home Hill opened, operating from a timber building that had formerly been used as Jensen's Boot Palace. The building was relocated to the present courthouse site, where it was replaced by the extant brick structure in 1937. The court house closed in 1991 after which it was occupied by a tourist information centre and then local radio station Sweet FM.

Home Hill's own newspaper the ''Home Hill Observer'' commenced in 1923 under proprietor and editor Thomas (Tom) Jackson, relocating offices a number of times over the years. In June 2014, the newspaper ceased publication; the then editor was David Jackson, grandson of Tom.

The Home Hill Agricultural, Horticultural and Industrial Society held its first show on 20 November 1926. In 1935 the society established its own grounds and erected pavilions. The shows were held annually (apart from 1942 to 1944 due to World War II) until 2001 when the shows were no longer economically viable. For two years beginning September 1943, the Royal Australian Air Force operated a radar station at Charlies Hill south of the town, staffed by approximately two dozen servicemen and women.

St Colman's Catholic School opened on 7 April 1927. It was operated by the Sisters of Mercy until 1967 when it came under the control of the Townsville Catholic Education Office.

On 16 February 1959, Cyclone Connie struck Home Hill. No building escaped damage with every window broken in the main street. One hundred people were made homeless.

The first Home Hill Harvest Festival was held in 1963. It continues to be held annually in November to celebrate the end of the sugar cane crushing season.

Home Hill State High School opened on 28 January 1964.

Some farmers began to experiment with rice in the 1960s with a local rice mill opening in 1968. However, the rice industry collapsed in Queensland in 1994 when the Queensland Rice Marketing Board experienced financial difficulties bringing this crop to an end in the Home Hill area. However, other crops have been introduced to the area and found their niche in the economy; they include mangoes, cucumbers, tomatoes, chillies, sorghum, maize, cotton and cassava.

Town water via a water tower was supplied in Home Hill from 27 March 1968. Prior to this many used windmills and electric pumps to extract water from beneath the ground. Sewerage was installed from 1976 to 1979 with most household using septic tanks before then.

In the mid-1980s, the economics of sugarcane farming worsened with rising costs and falling prices. Mechanisation was needed to reduce labour costs but the cost of purchasing the equipment was high. Small farms became increasingly less viable leading to the slogan "Get big or get out" which saw many leave the industry allowing those who remained to create larger more viable farms.

Home Hill library opened in 1984 and in 2017 underwent a major refurbishment.

In August 2016, two British backpackers were killed in a stabbing attack at the Home Hill Backpackers hostel, leaving others injured, by a French national shouted "Allahu Akbar" during the killings and during his arrest and who had allegedly used cannabis on the night of the attack.

== Demographics ==
In the 2006 census, the town of Home Hill had a population of 2,907 people.

In the 2011 census, the locality of Home Hill had a population of 3,027 people.

In the 2016 census, the locality of Home Hill had a population of 2,954 people.

In the 2021 census, the locality of Home Hill had a population of 2,876 people.

== Heritage listings ==
Home Hill has a number of heritage-listed sites, including:

- Home Hill Powerhouse, First Avenue (19.6697°S 147.4125°E)
- Greek Orthodox Church, 3 Eighth Avenue
- Old Home Hill Court House, 138–40 Eighth Avenue
- Doctor's Surgery, 143 Eighth Avenue
- Malpass Hote, 145 Eighth Avenue
- No. 211 Radar Station (RAAF), Charlies Hill, Iyah

== Economy ==
The town relies on its primary industries. The major crop is sugarcane. Other crops include mango and various vegetables.

The Inkerman Sugar Mill is in the north of the locality at Mill Lane (19.6431°S 147.4007°E).

== Education ==
Home Hill State School is a government primary (Prep-6) school for boys and girls at 113 Fourteenth Avenue (19.6533°S 147.4170°E). In 2018, the school had an enrolment of 266 students with 20 teachers (16 full-time equivalent) and 18 non-teaching staff (12 full-time equivalent).

St Colman's School is a Catholic primary (Prep-6) school for boys and girls at Eleventh Avenue (19.6593°S 147.4157°E). In 2018, the school had an enrolment of 50 students with 5 teachers (4 full-time equivalent) and 6 non-teaching staff (3 full-time equivalent).

Home Hill State High School is a government secondary (7–12) school for boys and girls at First Street (19.6677°S 147.4233°E). In 2018, the school had an enrolment of 241 students with 32 teachers (30 full-time equivalent) and 20 non-teaching staff (13 full-time equivalent). The school operates a primary and secondary (Prep-12) special education program.

The Burdekin campus of TAFE Queensland provides technical training at Seventeenth Avenue (19.6575°S 147.4054°E).

== Facilities ==
Home Hill Police Station is at 138–140 Eighth Avenue (19.6616°S 147.4122°E); it is adjacent to the Old Home Hill Court House (19.6615°S 147.4121°E).

Home Hill SES Facility is at 84 Eleventh Avenue (19.6608°S 147.4166°E).

Home Hill Health Service is a 14-bed public hospital at 72–82 Tenth Street, predominantly providing aged care services (19.6617°S 147.4167°E).

Home Hill Fire Station (19.6607°S 147.4165°E) and Home Hill Ambulance Station (19.6610°S 147.4159°E) both operate from 83 Tenth Avenue, adjacent to the hospital.

Home Hill Aged Hostel is a nursing home at 127–143 Tenth Avenue (19.6562°S 147.4137°E).

Home Hill Cemetery is at 63–85 Fourth Street (19.6637°S 147.4261°E).

Home Hill Wastewater Treatment Plant is a sewage treatment plant at 60 Bojack Road (19.6841°S 147.4302°E).

== Amenities ==
Burdekin Memorial Hall is a community centre at 77–79 Ninth Avenue (19.6622°S 147.4154°E). It has a large hall seating (seating up to 700 people), a small hall seating up to 120 people and a meeting room for up to 25 people. It also contains the Home Hill public library (19.6622°S 147.4151°E).

Despite the name, Home Hill Golf Club is 135 Iona Road in neighbouring Fredericksfield (19.6892°S 147.4064°E). It is a 9-hole course.

=== Churches ===
St Colman's Catholic Church is at 89–91 Tenth Avenue (19.6602°S 147.4154°E).

St Helen's Anglican Church is at 47 Fourteenth Street (19.6576°S 147.4125°E).

Burdekin Uniting Church has two churches, one at 32 Twelfth Street in Home Hill (19.6594°S 147.4124°E) and the other in Ayr. It is part of the North Queensland Presbytery of the Uniting Church in Australia.

St Stephen's Greek Orthodox Church is at 1–5 Eighth Avenue (19.6702°S 147.4179°E).

Burdekin Apostolic Church is in Eighteenth Street (19.6523°S 147.4072°E).

Home Hill Seventh-day Adventist Church is at 75 Thirteenth Avenue (19.6599°S 147.4195°E).

== Events ==
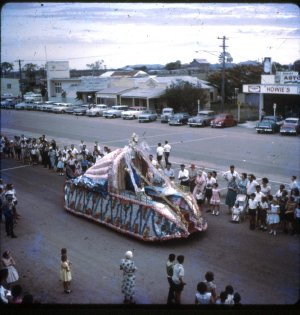
1963 Home Hill Harvest Festival

The Home Hill Harvest Festival is an annual week-long program of events held in November, culminating in a street parade and Mardi Gras.

The Burdekin Race Club holds regular race days at Home Hill.

== Attractions ==
The main attractions in Home Hill are the Burdekin Bridge and Inkerman Sugar Mill. In the past few years it has become increasingly popular for backpackers, who flock to the area to earn money planting and harvesting crops.

== Notable residents ==
- Anne Geddes, photographer
- Gordon Hookey, artist
- Rosemary Menkens, politician
- Donald Nicklin, chemical engineer and professor, born in Home Hill
- Craig Wallace, politician
- Adam Walton, tennis player
- Reece D'Alessandro, television journalist

== See also ==
- List of tramways in Queensland
