= Bones Knob Radar Station =

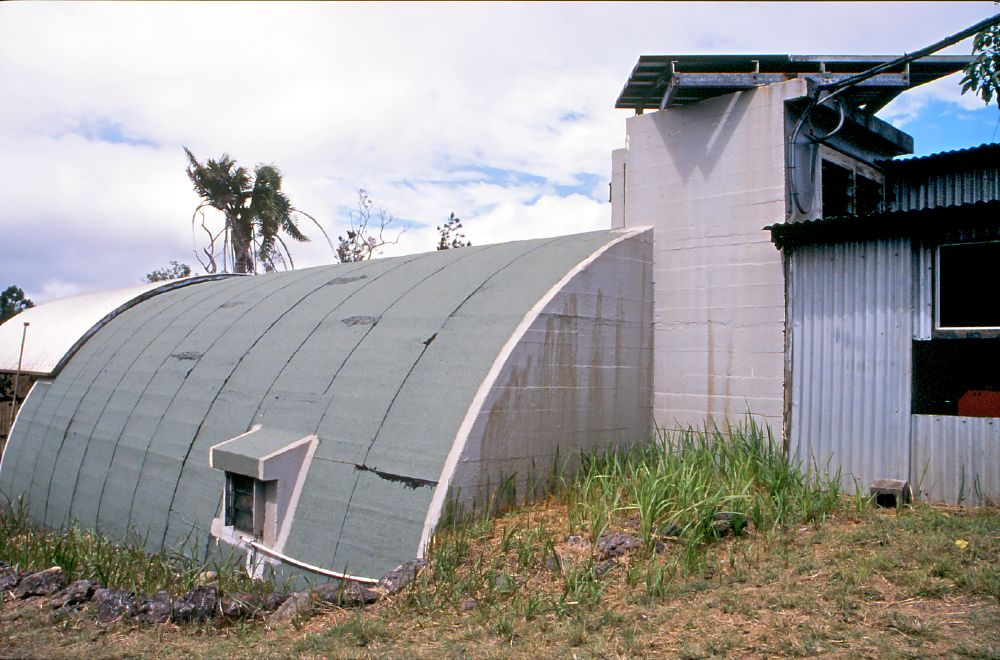
- Bones Knob Radar Station igloo, 2007

- Location within Queensland Location within Australia
- 17.2171°S 145.4446°E
- Location: Bowcock Road, Tolga, Tablelands Region, Queensland, Australia

History
- Design period: 1939–1945 (World War II)
- Built: 1943

Queensland Heritage Register
- Official name: WWII RAAF 220 Radar Station, Bones Knob Radar Station
- Type: state heritage (built)
- Designated: 14 May 2010
- Reference no.: 602741
- Significant period: 1943–1945
- Significant components: tower – radar, igloo

Bones Knob Radar Station is a heritage-listed radar station at Bowcock Road, Tolga, Tablelands Region, Queensland, Australia. It was built in 1943. It is also known as WWII RAAF 220 Radar Station. It was added to the Queensland Heritage Register on 14 May 2010.

== History ==
RAAF 220 Radar Station was one of five British-designed Advanced Chain Overseas (ACO) radar stations constructed in Queensland during World War II: four being completed (Benowa, Toorbul Point, Inkermann and Bones Knob) and a fifth not completed (Paluma). Early British wartime radar technology evolved rapidly and the ACO system was already outdated when introduced in Australia in 1943. ACO radar stations were built to the design of the Directorate of Works for the British Air Ministry and were very conspicuous through their two 40-metre (130 ft) high timber towers and two reinforced concrete radar transmitting and receiving shelters. RAAF 220 Radar Station, located at Bones Knob near Tolga on the Atherton Tableland, became operational in September 1943. It played a role in the protection of the large concentration of ammunition, ordnance and stores depots established on the Atherton Tableland as part of the assembly and training of Australian troops for the final phase of the New Guinea and island campaigns. Operation of the Radar Station at Bones Knob ceased in December 1944 as the South West Pacific frontline moved further north.

Radar in Australia By the late 1930s Britain had become concerned with defence against aerial bombing and the development of radio direction finding systems for air warning and interception was receiving top priority. By contrast Australia's defence strategy was focused on preventing attacks on coastal targets by enemy warships. Air Warning (AW) radar had low priority in Australia and if the need arose, so went the argument, AW sets could be obtained from Britain.

The British Committee of Imperial Defence first shared their technical radar knowledge with Australian, New Zealand, South African and Canadian scientists in a top secret meeting in London in February 1939. It was anticipated that the Commonwealth countries would commence their own research and use the new technology for defence developments. Australia was represented at the meeting by Dr David Martyn who ordered a substantial quantity of British radar equipment including six high frequency (HF) transmitters, designated MB (Mobile Base). With appropriate aerials on high towers, broad coverage patterns were being produced by the new British CH (Chain Home) stations. These stations gave long-range warning of high flying aircraft. However, transmitter/receivers for an air warning system against low flying aircraft (CHL or Chain Home Low Flying) were still being developed in Britain. Sets were ordered for delivery to Australia when completed, but delivery times were uncertain.

In August 1939, just weeks before the outbreak of World War II, the Australian Council for Scientific and Industrial Research approved the creation of the Radiophysics Laboratory (RPL) within the University of Sydney. Scientists at RPL, led by Dr David Martyn and Dr John Piddington, were concerned that sooner or later AW radar would be needed in Australia to warn of aerial attack and that existing air defence policy was too complacent.

During the first months of the war the Australian defence forces were without anyone specially trained in the tactical operation of radar and in March 1940 each service selected an officer to be sent to Britain for this purpose. The RAAF candidate was Pilot Officer Albert Pither who had previously completed an RAF signals course in England. In September 1940 he was posted to Britain for a two-month course in the tactical uses of radar including inspection of equipment in each of the British services. Pither was in Britain when the technology was put to use during the Battle of Britain. He returned to Australia by way of radar centres in Canada and the United States of America. In May 1941 Pither was promoted to Wing Commander in charge of the Radar Section of the RAAF Directorate of Signals. He began developing a plan to surround Australia with a chain of radar stations based on his experience with the British Chain Home system which relied on fixed transmitter and receiver towers. He also established a Radio (radar) School at the Richmond RAAF Station near Sydney. In early November 1941, one month before the Japanese attack on Pearl Harbor, the RAAF was given full responsibility for Australia's early warning radar operations and adopted Pither's radar defence strategy.

The delays that Australia experienced in acquiring British radar equipment spurred an innovative period of radar development by Australian scientists. Distance, competing demands and lack of material resources made it likely that Australia would not receive its first shipment of radar equipment until the middle of 1942. As a result, when news of the Japanese attack on Pearl Harbor broke, Dr Piddington and his colleagues at RPL set about modifying the electronics of an experimental British set which was available. Reportedly within five and a half days they produced the first Australian-made AW set. The AW employed an innovative switching circuit developed by Dr Joseph Pawsey of RPL and aerials engineered by J.G. Worledge at the New South Wales Railway's Eveleigh Railway Workshops. The set was operational by 12 December 1941 and provided Sydney's only air warning for some months. The transmitter and receiver were comparatively light in weight and were subsequently modified to provide the electronics for Australia's principal air warning radar the LW/AW MkI and MkII. The radar equipment was manufactured in Sydney by The Gramophone Company. By the time the British ACO (Advanced Chain Overseas) radar system was installed at Bones Knob in September 1943, features of its design had already been superseded by the Australian LW/AW radar, especially its conspicuous twin towers.

ACO Radar Nine British ACO radar stations were installed in Australia in 1943, although the original intention was to erect 32 TRUs (Transportable Radar Unit) - a similar unit which differed in the type of aerial towers. However, the British government decided to terminate the Australian contract for the provision of TRUs so that these sets could be used in Africa. Instead Australia was supplied with nine ACO units. This meant that the RAAF had to provide timber for the fixed 40.2-metre (132 ft) towers, instead of the collapsible and transportable ones used in the TRU. The result was long delays in the erection of some ACO stations.

Of the nine Australian ACO stations, four were erected in Queensland at RAAF 209 Radar Station at Benowa (since demolished), RAAF 210 Radar Station at Toorbul Point, RAAF 211 Radar Station at Inkermann (Charlie's Hill Radar Station), and RAAF 220 Radar Station at Bones Knob near Tolga. An ACO station was started at Paluma, and igloos were built that still exist on Lennox Crescent, but the towers were never built, as the ACO program was cancelled in late 1943. While the ACO unit was popular with operators, it was unpopular with the RAAF for a number of reasons. When compared with other sets in use the ACO was expensive, sophisticated and complex. Installation was measured in months rather than days with further delays in matching and phasing the aerial system. Also, the fixed nature of the two massive timber towers and their 40.2-metre (132 ft) height made camouflaging them almost impossible.

The ACO electronics were the second generation of the British CH (Chain Home) type of radar, a "floodlit" system operating on the VHF band. The British electronics contained panels and features not used in other radars or deemed necessary in the Pacific.

The igloos were built to house the radar electronics and two tonne consoles for the transmitter and receiver. The buildings were intended to be earth covered and were designed with a small tower at one end which was equipped with a ladder and served as a ventilator and escape passage. Entrance doorways at the other end were large enough to accommodate the radar consoles.

The transmitter was a British MB3 model which put out 250 kW of power at 42.5 MHz. The frequency was in the VHF band which would later become common for use in television transmission, but in 1943 this short wavelength was unfamiliar technology. The transmitter aerial system was in two parts set at different heights (at 37.2 and 14.3 metres (122 and 47 ft) high) to enable height finding using the floodlit system. Each part had four elements to cover four sectors of 120 degrees.

The receiver was a British RF7 (receiver fixed location) built in four vertical racks held in a frame of 2 x 2 x 0.6 metres (2 ft 0 in). The receiver detected radio echoes from all directions simultaneously. The receiver compared the strength of an echo from within a radius to identify the direction from which the signal was originating. The receiver had two parts on the tower (at 40.2 and 14.3 metres (132 and 47 ft) high) plus crossed dipoles used for the height finding of an aircraft by comparing the echoes from the higher and lower sections of the tower.

The towers were of pre-cut and prefabricated construction, the timber used being Australian oak. One tower was for transmitting and the other tower for receiving radar signals. The transmitter tower was equipped with a three-stack array at the 37.2-metre (122 ft) level and a two-stack Gap Filler at the 14.3-metre (47 ft) level. The receiver tower array comprised two crossed dipoles at the 40.2-metre (132 ft) and the 14.3-metre (47 ft) level.

The towers did not rotate like those commonly used in other radar models. The ACO radar installation consisted of 14 switches on the receiver tower and more on the transmitter. These had to be constantly relayed from on to off, lower to higher, and to between different directions. The switches were controlled by the radar operators from the radar consoles located within the concrete igloos. Aircraft activity was monitored from an eleven-inch cathode ray tube screen. Using the goniometer consisting of switches and controls of the direction and height finding components, the operator would monitor the screen and make comparisons to decipher the direction, elevation and distance of the aircraft.

In essence the ACO was totally unsuited to the fluid nature of war in the Pacific and was not used in the region, except in Australia, although intended for Singapore and Malaya. However, in a fixed situation it had some advantages over the more portable British COL (Chain Overseas Low Flying) and Australian LW/AW mostly in use, including better penetration of thunderstorms and better height- finding ability. Ranges in excess of 320 kilometres (200 mi) were recorded on high flying aircraft and ACOs fulfilled the secondary role of assisting navigation of Allied aircraft.

Operation of 220 Radar Station RAAF 220 Radar Station was formed at Camden, New South Wales, on 7 July 1943. The unit moved to Mascot for further training on 13 August 1943 and arrived at Tolga on 23 September, moving to Bones Knob the following day. The initial strength of the radar station was two officers and 34 airmen. A site plan for the installation at Bones Knob had been prepared by the Department of the Interior, Townsville, on 2 September 1942. Therefore, work may have already begun on construction of two concrete transmitter/receiver igloos, a smaller concrete igloo power house and two transmitter/receiver towers, together with a camp area and water storage tanks.

During the early months of 1943 the headquarters of the Australian Army in north Queensland was transferred from Townsville to the Atherton Tableland. Installation of a radar station at Bones Knob reflected the strategic importance of the planned concentration of ammunition, ordnance and stores depots in the Atherton district as part of the assembly and training of Australian troops for the final phase of the New Guinea and island campaigns.

ACO radar stations were built to the design of the Directorate of Works for the Air Ministry in Britain. In Australia, their construction was supervised by the Allied Works Council. The timber towers for 220 Radar Station were prefabricated by the Civil Construction Corps in Sydney from Australian oak supplied by the timber merchants Codey and Willis of Glebe, New South Wales. The firm was employed by the Allied Works Council and had the contract for the prefabrication and erection of the transmitter and receiver towers for the ACO stations. The timbers were cut to specifications, marked, and then shipped to the nearest port, in this case Cairns. In some instances the timber had shrunk when the builders started to construct the towers and it was necessary to re-drill the bolt holes on site. The timber towers were attached at the base to steel members set in four concrete footings. The towers were designed to withstand cyclone-strength winds in the Far East.

Electronic radar equipment for the station was installed and calibrated by specialist RAAF personnel. 220 Radar Station was a unit of RAAF 42 Radar Wing with headquarters in Townsville. Headquarters was responsible for the establishment of 2 RIMU (Radar Installation and Maintenance Unit) which provided specialist installation, calibration and maintenance support for RAAF radar stations in north Queensland. Radar mechanics regularly were required to climb the towers to service relay switches and aerials.

War-time radar operators played a significant role in saving the lives of airmen, but manning a remote radar station in northern Queensland was a routine and mostly uneventful task. To alleviate the boredom, the men of 220 Radar Station regularly travelled to Tolga, Atherton and Mareeba to the picture shows. A tennis court was constructed at the station during 1944 and cricket matches and table tennis tournaments between RAAF and Army units also helped to pass the time.

Operation of 220 Radar Station ceased on 7 December 1944 and during the month the unit commenced packing for its move to Townsville. By early January 1945 half the personnel of the unit had departed for Townsville leaving the remainder to assist with packing and dismantling the receiver and transmitter. The unit completed the move to Townsville on 18 January 1945 and was disbanded on 13 February 1945.

== Description ==
The former WWII RAAF 220 Radar Station stands at the summit of a timbered hill called Bones Knob, which is located about 3 kilometres (1.9 mi) west of Tolga. There is farmland to the west, south and east of the hill, and a steep cliff is located northwest of the radar station.

The former military complex at Bones Knob comprises two concrete igloo buildings, a smaller concrete igloo for the station power plant, and concrete/steel footings of one radar tower. Recent additions include a steel bow-roof dwelling, a large on-ground water tank and an earth dam. Attached to one igloo is a small lean-to containing an alternative power plant. Entrances to both igloos are sheltered under bow-roof verandahs. None of the post-WWII improvements to the site are of heritage significance.

Two igloo buildings with semi-circular reinforced concrete roofs are the principal structures. Their design, layout and dimensions are identical with those of the Charlies Hill ACO radar station near Home Hill. Each igloo is 11.20 metres (36.7 ft) in length and 7 metres (23 ft) wide, and spaced 55 metres (180 ft) apart in parallel alignment.

The Bones Knob igloos have been adapted as a studio and a storeroom respectively, and recent timber floors cover concrete recesses and raised platforms for electrical cables and the securing of radar equipment.

A smaller reinforced concrete igloo is located about 250 metres (820 ft) south of the transmitter and receiver igloos. This concrete igloo is similar in size and construction to those that housed generating plants associated with radar stations at Paluma and Horn Hill (an LW/AW radar station on Horn Island).

A 40.2-metre (132 ft) high timber tower was originally located alongside each igloo. Only the base of the northern tower was observed. Because of conditions at the time of survey, no evidence of the base of the southern tower could be seen. The tower footings comprise four 1-square-metre (11 sq ft) concrete foundations, each containing two steel members about 1.5 metres (4 ft 11 in) in height to which the timber base of the tower was attached with bolts. No timber-work survives. The surviving steelwork is severely corroded. A shallow circular concrete pit about 2 metres (6 ft 7 in) in diameter, is located under the centre of the tower. The base of the tower occupies an area of about 12 square metres (130 sq ft).

== Heritage listing ==
Bones Knob Radar Station was listed on the Queensland Heritage Register on 14 May 2010 having satisfied the following criteria.

The place is important in demonstrating the evolution or pattern of Queensland's history.

The remains of the former Radar Station at Bones Knob are significant evidence of Queensland's participation in the network of air warning radar stations established at strategic locations throughout Australia during World War II. The place also has historical associations with the early introduction and development of British air warning radar technology during the war, being one of nine British-designed Advanced Chain Overseas (ACO) radar stations built in Australia during World War II, and one of five constructed in Queensland: at Benowa (no longer extant), Toorbul Point (extant), Home Hill (extant – Charlie's Hill Radar Station), Bones Knob (extant) and Paluma (extant but never completed).

In addition, the Radar Station at Bones Knob demonstrates the strategic importance of the concentration of ammunition, ordnance and stores depots on the Atherton Tableland as part of the assembly and training of Australian troops for the final phase of the New Guinea and island campaigns.

The place demonstrates rare, uncommon or endangered aspects of Queensland's cultural heritage.

The Radar Station demonstrates rare and uncommon aspects of Queensland's cultural heritage being one of four extant examples of British designed Advanced Chain Overseas (ACO) radar stations in Queensland.

The place is important in demonstrating the principal characteristics of a particular class of cultural places.

The Radar Station is important in demonstrating the principal characteristics of its type through its: elevated location; standard design reinforced concrete igloo shelters with escape towers, for housing radar transmitting and receiving equipment; and concrete and steel footings for timber radar towers.
