= Radar Station =

Radar Station may refer to:

- Radar station
- Radar Station (film), a 1953 Canadian short documentary film
- Radar Station, Mazandaran, a village and military installation in Mazandaran Province, Iran
- Radar Station, Charlie's Hill, a heritage-listed radar station, Queensland, Australia
