= Atherton War Cemetery =

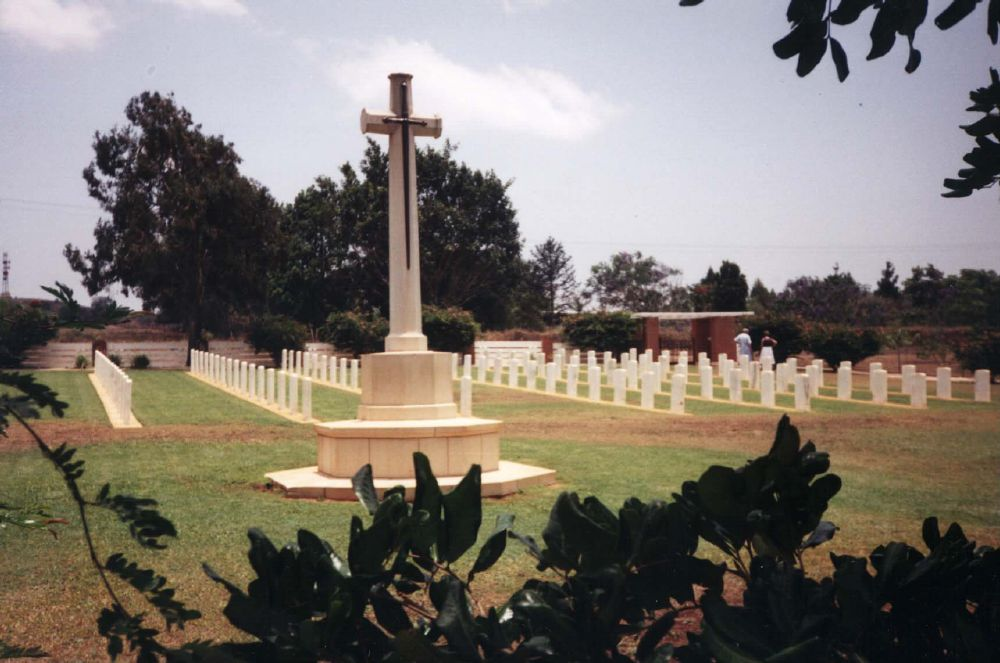
- Atherton War Cemetery

- Location within Queensland Location within Australia
- 17.2765°S 145.4937°E
- Location: Corner of Kennedy Highway and Rockley Road, Atherton, Tablelands Region, Queensland, Australia

History
- Built: 1942

Queensland Heritage Register
- Official name: Atherton War Cemetery
- Type: state heritage (built)
- Designated: 19 November 2010
- Reference no.: 602765

Atherton War Cemetery is a heritage-listed cemetery at the corner of Kennedy Highway and Rockley Road, Atherton, Tablelands Region, Queensland, Australia. It was built in 1942. It was added to the Queensland Heritage Register on 19 November 2010.

== History ==
The Atherton War Cemetery established in 1942, is situated within the Atherton Cemetery Reserve on the Kennedy Highway on the outskirts of Atherton. It contains a Cross of Sacrifice and 164 graves and headstones for soldiers and airmen killed during World War II. The Atherton War Cemetery is an example of the way in which the Imperial War Graves Commission's design principles, which were developed and implemented after World War I, were applied in a region that is significant for its World War II history and associations.

=== Commonwealth War Graves ===
The Imperial War Graves Commission (which became the Commonwealth War Graves Commission in 1960) was established in Britain by Royal Charter on 21 May 1917. The Commission's founder and vice chairman, Sir Fabian Ware, had submitted a memorandum to the 1917 Imperial War Conference outlining his concern for the upkeep of graves and sites of commemoration. During the conflict, Ware had used his mobile British Red Cross Unit to register and care for graves, and had received countless requests from bereaved families for information regarding their loved ones.

Once the Commission was formed, it resolved to create lasting memorials to those who lost their lives in battle and those families who had lost their loved ones.

To fulfil this aim, the Commission engaged eminent British architects to design the cemeteries and memorials. Sir Edwin Lutyens, Sir Herbert Baker and Sir Reginald Blomfield were the first three principal architects of the Commission and the Director of the British Museum, Sir Frederic Kenyon, drew their recommendations into a set of key principles regarding the development and management of the cemeteries. These principles determined that each of the dead should be commemorated by name on the headstone or memorial; headstones and memorials should be permanent; headstones should be uniform; and there should be no distinction made on account of military or civil rank, race or creed.

The principles were then applied to three experimental cemeteries at Le Treport, Louvencourt and Forceville in France. Of these, the last was considered the most successful. In consultation with renowned garden designer Gertrude Jekyll, a walled cemetery was built there with rows of uniform headstones set in narrow garden beds within a lawn in a symmetrical layout with a centre aisle between Blomfield's Cross of Sacrifice on the western boundary and Lutyens' Stone of Remembrance on the eastern boundary. After some adjustments, Forceville became the template for the Commission's building program.

The Imperial (later Commonwealth) War Graves cemeteries thus incorporated the following key elements (although some were contingent on the number of burials):

==== Cross of Sacrifice ====
The central focus of war cemeteries with over 40 burials is the Cross of Sacrifice. It was designed by Sir Reginald Blomfield, an Imperial War Graves Commission architect. He created a tall, finely proportioned stone cross, with a symbolic downward pointing sword of bronze attached to its face, thus emphasising both the military character of the cemetery and the religious affiliation of the majority of the dead. It was designed to represent the faith of the majority and generally ranges in height between 4.5 metres (15 ft) and 9 metres (30 ft) depending on the size of the cemetery.

==== Stone of Remembrance ====
Sir Edwin Lutyens was responsible for designing a general monument to be placed in war cemeteries called the Stone of Remembrance. It is suggestive of an altar and yet abstract and non-denominational, with horizontal lines and curved surfaces. The design was based on complex geometry derived from the Parthenon, giving an impression of majesty and tranquillity. Inscribed on the stone is the quote "Their name liveth for evermore", taken from the Ecclesiasticus and chosen by Rudyard Kipling. The Stone of Remembrance is present in cemeteries where there are more than 1,000 burials and occasionally elsewhere although not at Atherton.

==== Headstones ====
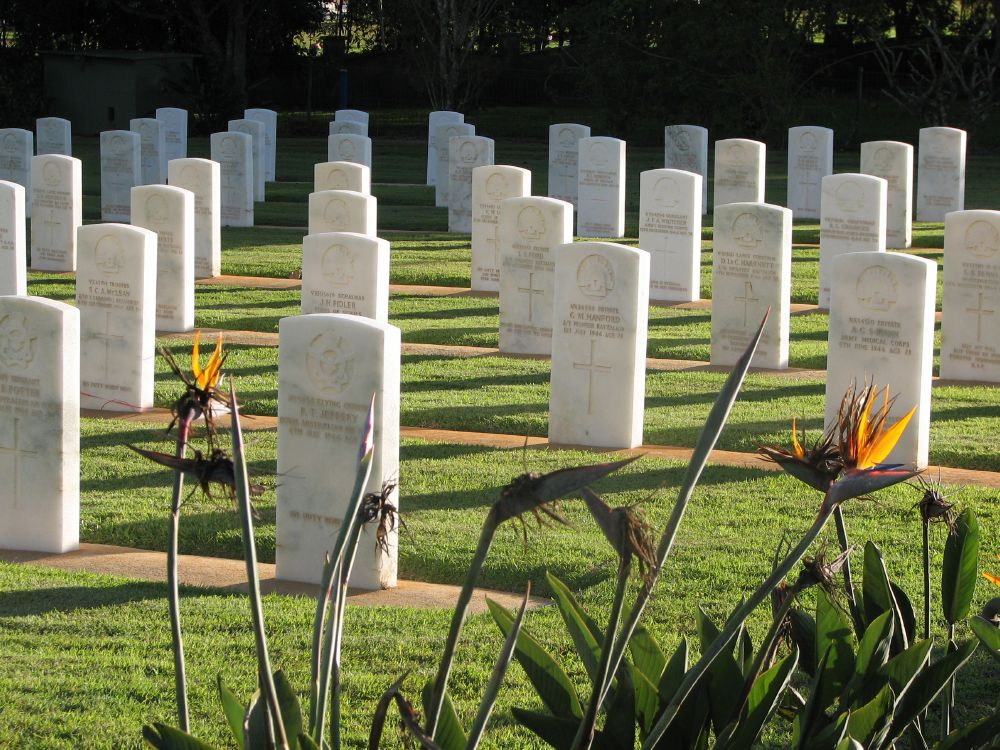
Headstones in Atherton War Cemetery, 2005

Imperial (later Commonwealth) War Graves Commission cemeteries contain headstones of a standard pattern, usually set in perfectly straight rows. At the top of each headstone is engraved the national emblem or the service or regimental badge of the dead person, followed by their rank, name, unit, date of death, age and often an appropriate religious emblem. At the foot of the headstone there is, in many cases, an inscription chosen by the person's relatives. Some cemeteries, for climatic reasons, use low pedestals with bronze plaques instead of headstones.

=== Horticulture ===
Creating a garden setting for war cemeteries, in an effort to make them places of quite contemplation, beauty and soothing to the bereaved, was one of the earliest ideas generated by the War Graves Commission. These ideas were put into practice by the architects involved, in particular Sir Edwin Lutyens who worked closely with the renowned garden designer Gertrude Jekyll. Her ideas about traditional cottage garden plants, particularly flowering ones, and their placement greatly influenced the appearance of war cemeteries.

Soon after the Commission completed its program of World War I cemeteries in 1938, World War II began and the Commission realised that their efforts would be needed in many more countries. As that war progressed in the Allies' favour, the Commission began restoring its WWI cemeteries and memorials and commenced the task of commemorating 600,000 Commonwealth casualties from WWII. It built 559 new cemeteries and 36 new memorials and changed its name to the Commonwealth War Graves Commission in the 1960s as the construction program of WWII cemeteries drew to a close.

=== Atherton War Cemetery ===
The Atherton War Cemetery was created on land adjoining the Atherton General Cemetery (1928) in 1942, the year before the Tableland's Base Area was established as part of the Atherton Project (when the Australian Army Headquarters moved from Townsville to the Tablelands) and at the same time that the Australian General Hospital (2/2 and 2/6) at Rocky Creek commenced operations. The area between Atherton and Cairns was used extensively as a training ground during World War II for Australian troops involved in action in New Guinea, Bougainville and the later landings at Aitape-Wewak, Tarakan, Labuan and Balikpapan. The Tablelands Base Area created a constant flow of Army traffic through Atherton's main street, as camps were set up to train troops in jungle warfare before their being sent to the islands north of Australia. Australia's 6th, 7th and 9th Division were based in the Atherton region. Wounded soldiers were taken to the Rocky Creek Hospital Complex as well as to the station hospital at Mareeba State School.

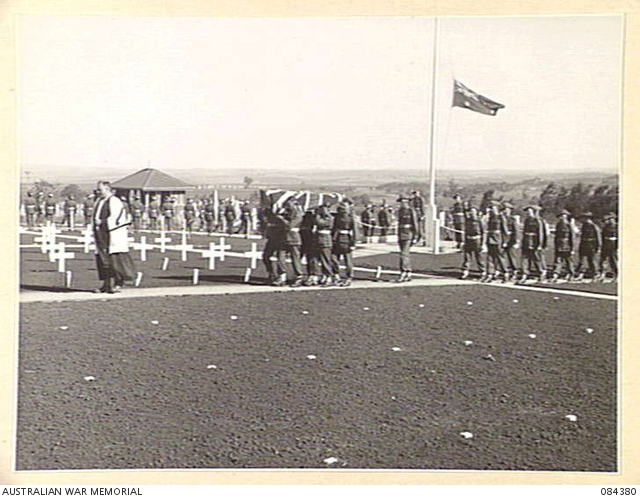
Funeral service at Atherton War Cemetery, 12 December 1944

The first burial in the Atherton War Cemetery took place following the death on 4 January 1943 of Gunner Andrew Mervyn Hemsworth, of the Royal Australian Artillery (Grave AC1). In 1944 the cemetery was resurveyed and redesigned by members of the 7th Graves Registration and Environment Unit. Plans reveal a symmetrical design that comprised a grid of three equal sized plots A, B C in an east-west orientation with 11 evenly spaced rows containing 10 rows of 16 and one row of four headstones. The plots were separated by gravel paths. To the south of the plots an expanse of lawn divided into three with gravel paths, contained a Cross of Sacrifice at its centre. The whole was surrounded by a gravel roadway with gardens/lawn between it and the perimeter fencing. The burials were arranged chronologically with 1943–1944 burials occurring in Plot A, 1944 burials in Plot B and 1945–46 burials in Plot C. Graves in the Atherton War Cemetery were initially marked by white wooden timber crosses and later replaced with the marble headstones although there are no documentary records that specifically state when this occurred. Photographic records held at the Australian War Memorial indicate the change occurred between 1944 and 1949.

The last three burials arose from an explosion of cordite on 29 November 1946 during the post-war cleanup of an ammunition dump at 13 Australian Advanced Ordnance Depot at nearby Tolga. The three members of the Royal Australian Army Ordnance Corps working at the site were severely burned but managed to crawl over 1 mile (1.6 km) back to their headquarters. Despite being rushed to the hospital in Atheron, Private Graham William Patrick Brown and Private Robert Alister Doyle Breingan died on 30 November 1946 while Lieutenant Frank Stuart-Boyle died on 1 December 1946. The three men were buried at the Atherton War Cemetery.

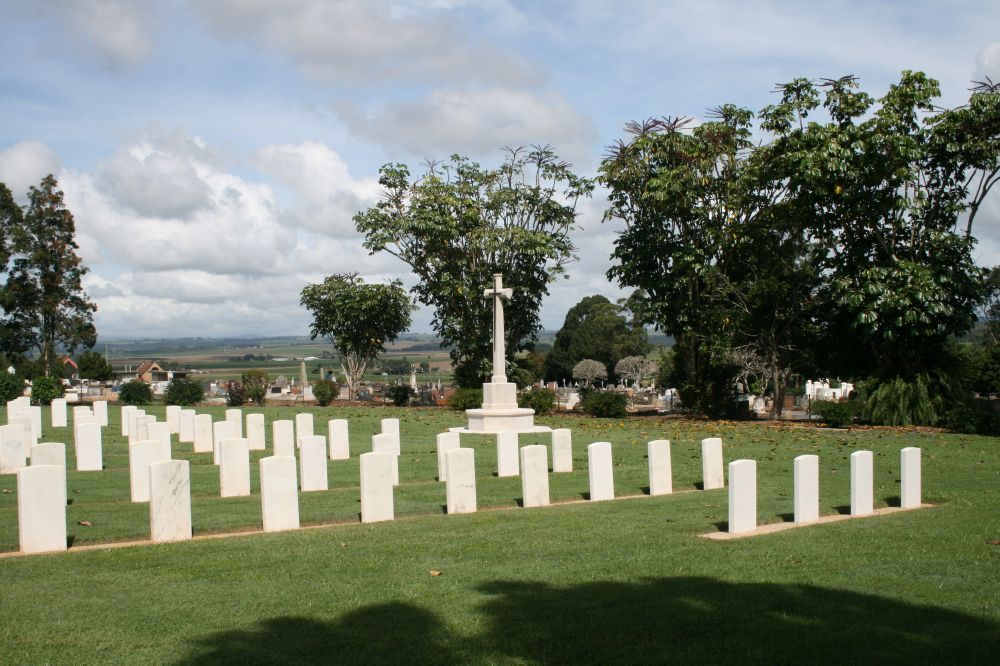
Format layout of the war cemetery contrasted the less formal general cemetery to the rear, 2008

Early images depict a flag pole in the cemetery, which was the focal point for each burial service. The flagpole has been replaced by the Cross of Sacrifice, in keeping with Commission policy that cemeteries with more than 40 graves have a Cross of Sacrifice. In total, there are 164 graves in the cemetery, representing 19 different Australian regiments including: Infantry, Army Service Corps, Air Force, Volunteer Defence Corps, Medical Corps and Engineers. One grave belongs to a member of the Young Men's Christian Association.

A formal agreement was made in 1948 between the Shire of Atherton and the Imperial War Graves Commission (Anzac Agency) to hold Atherton War Cemetery in perpetuity for use as a war cemetery and granted rights to the Commission regarding use of the land.

There are 14 war cemeteries and plots in Queensland, including the one at Atherton: Lutwyche War Cemetery (386 burials) and Cremation Memorial, Bundaberg War Cemetery (35 burials), Ipswich War Cemetery (68 burials), Kingaroy War Cemetery (22 burials), Maryborough War Cemetery (10 burials), Rockhampton War Cemetery (36 burials), Toowoomba War Cemetery (44 burials within the Drayton and Toowoomba Cemetery), Townsville War Cemetery (222 burials), Cairns War Cemetery (98 burials), Charters Towers War Cemetery (33 burials), Gympie War Cemetery (5 burials), Warwick War Cemetery (21 burials within the Warwick General Cemetery), and Woombye War Cemetery (26 burials). In addition there are a number of individual war graves in civil cemeteries throughout Queensland. The war cemeteries and individual graves in civil cemeteries are maintained by the Office of Australian War Graves, a branch of the Department of Veterans' Affairs. The Office of Australian War Graves is the agent of the Commonwealth War Graves Commission in Australia, Papua New Guinea, Solomon Islands and Norfolk Island.

== Description ==
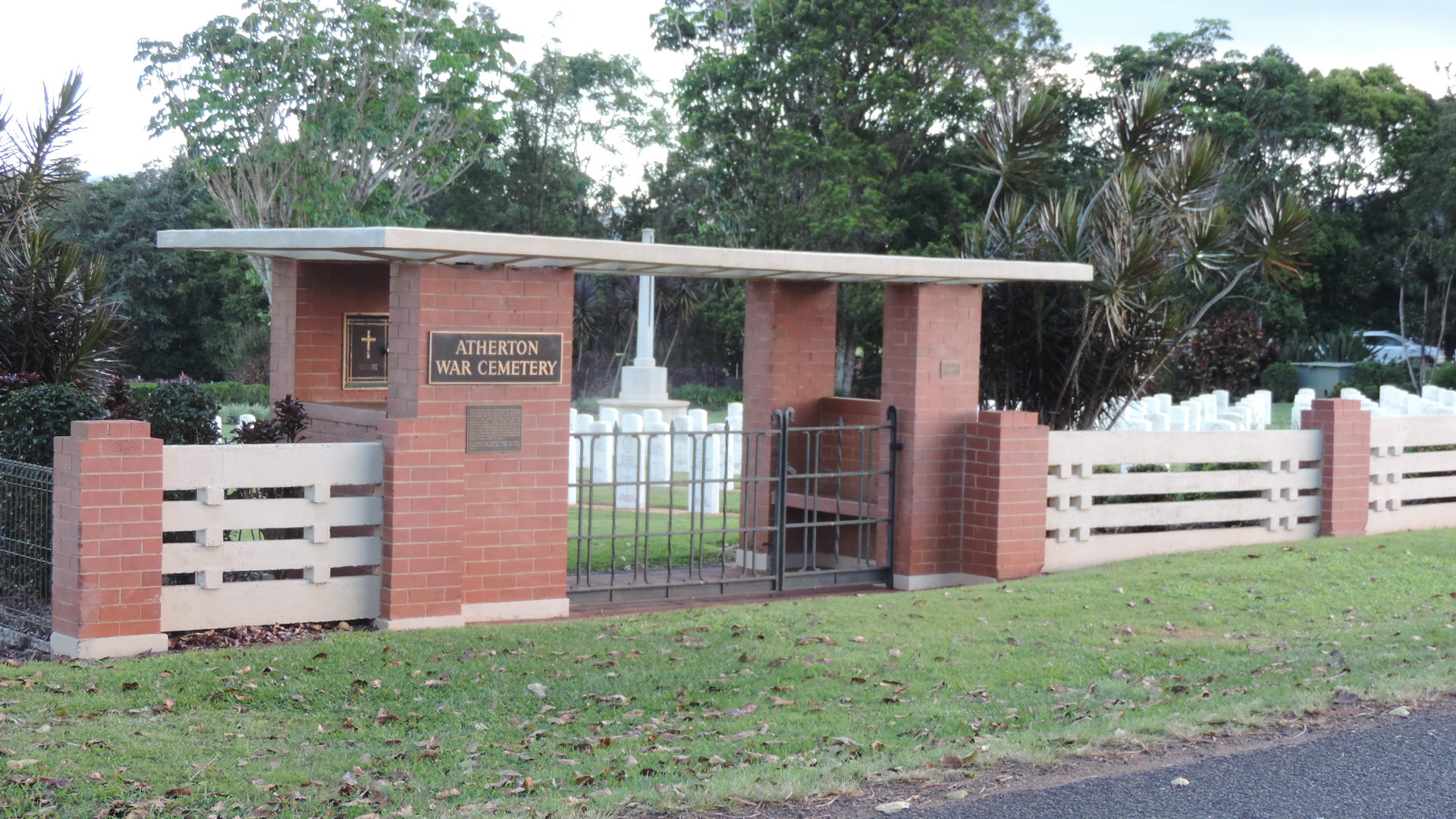
Entrance, 2016

The Atherton War Cemetery is located within the Atherton Cemetery Reserve on the south-eastern outskirts of the town. The war cemetery occupies the north-western corner of the triangular shaped 3.9 hectares (9.6 acres) reserve which is bounded by Rockley Road to the north and the Kennedy Highway to the south-west.

The main entrance to the war cemetery is at the eastern end of the northern boundary which is formed by a brick pier and four-rail concrete fence. Wrought iron gates secure the entrance which is incorporated into a shelter constructed of brick columns with a concrete lattice roof. The shelter houses a bench, and a register box for a visitors' book and cemetery register. Bronze plated plaques attached to the shelter are inscribed as follows:

THIS WAR CEMETERY IS MAINTAINED ON BEHALF OF THE COMMONWEALTH WAR GRAVES COMMISSION BY THE OFFICE OF AUSTRALIAN WAR GRAVES

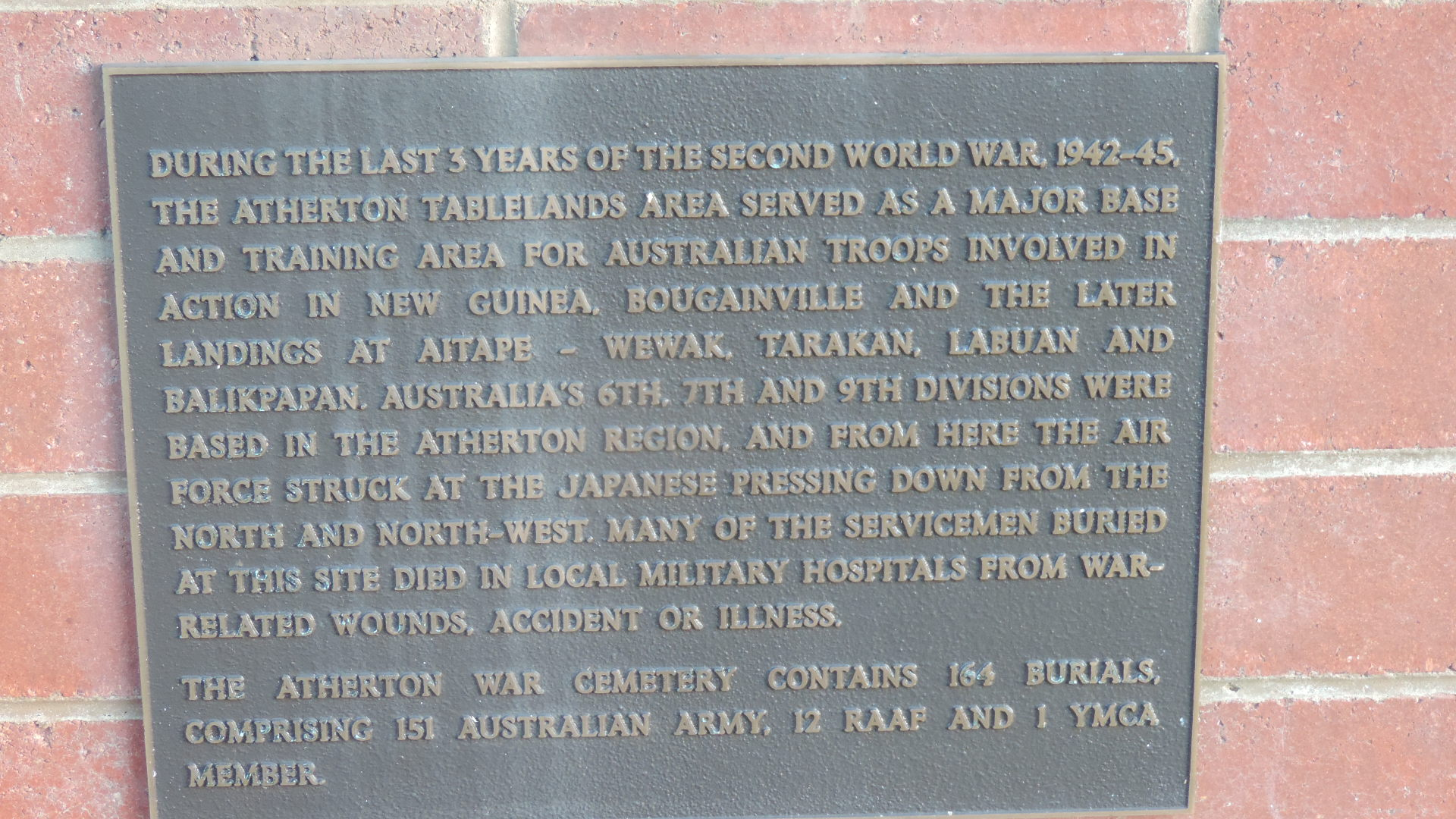
Plaque, 2016

Another bronze plaque reads:

DURING THE LAST 3 YEARS OF THE SECOND WORLD WAR, 1942–45, THE ATHERTON TABLELANDS AREA SERVED AS A MAJOR BASE AND TRAINING AREA FOR AUSTRALIAN TROOPS INVOLVED IN ACTION IN NEW GUINEA, BOUGAINVILLE AND THE LATER LANDINGS AT AITAPE – WEWAK, TARAKAN, LABUAN AND BALIKPAPAN. AUSTRALIA'S 6TH, 7TH AND 9TH DIVISIONS WERE BASED IN THE ATHERTON REGION, AND FROM HERE THE AIR FORCE STRUCK AT THE JAPANESE PRESSING DOWN FROM THE NORTH AND NORTH-WEST. MANY OF THE SERVICEMEN BURIED AT THIS SITE DIED IN LOCAL MILITARY HOSPITALS FROM WAR-RELATED WOUNDS, ACCIDENT OR ILLNESS.

THE ATHERTON WAR CEMETERY CONTAINS 164 BURIALS, COMPRISING 151 AUSTRALIAN ARMY, 12 RAAF AND 1 YMCA MEMBER.

A secondary service entrance for site management is located at the western end of the northern boundary fence with the remaining boundaries enclosed with mesh panel fencing.

The Atherton War Cemetery contains 164 uniformly marked and spaced graves and a Cross of Sacrifice set within a manicured lawn and gardens. Each of the graves is marked by a white marble headstone, rectangular in shape with a rounded top, carved military insignia, name, and rank of each soldier buried. Some headstones bear an epitaph. The headstones are evenly arranged in 11 rows, set into a concrete strip footing. Ten of these contain 16 headstones each, the final row has four.

The Cross of Sacrifice is located approximately 7.5 metres (25 ft) from the middle row of the headstones and stands about 4 metres (13 ft) high, set on a 3-metre (9.8 ft) square base. The cross is made of sandstone with bronze swords mounted on two sides. The plinth, base, stem and cross are octagonal.

While the arrangement of garden beds at the perimeter of the cemetery is of cultural heritage significance, the plant species within them are not and are replaced and upgraded from time to time to the standard required by the Commonwealth War Graves Commission and specified in the Commonwealth War Graves Commission Horticultural Manual.

== Heritage listing ==
Atherton War Cemetery was listed on the Queensland Heritage Register on 19 November 2010 having satisfied the following criteria as described by the registry verbatim below.

The place is important in demonstrating the evolution or pattern of Queensland's history.

"The Atherton War Cemetery is important in demonstrating the pattern of Queensland's history, being a product of Australia's involvement in World War II. North Queensland in general and the Atherton Tablelands in particular were important military sites during this country's involvement in the war in the South-West Pacific between 1941 and 1945. The Atherton War Cemetery is important as a memorial site to Australian soldiers and airmen who fought and died during the conflict, particularly in New Guinea."

"The Atherton War Cemetery is closely associated with the Imperial (later Commonwealth) War Graves Commission, established by Sir Fabian Ware in 1921 to commemorate all individuals killed during war and to provide their families with a dignified and lasting memorial."

The place is important in demonstrating the principal characteristics of a particular class of cultural places.

"The Atherton War Cemetery is important in illustrating the principal features drawn from the design guidelines that were established after World War I by the Imperial (later Commonwealth) War Graves Commission to ensure war cemeteries of this size suitably commemorated the fallen. These include uniform headstones in regular rows, the Cross of Sacrifice and manicured gardens; aspects of which appear in the 2,500 war cemeteries constructed in approximately 150 countries around the world and serve to make a dignified and reverential memorial site. These key characteristics and the aesthetic quality they create have strong associations with four internationally significant architects: Sir Edwin Lutyens, Sir Herbert Baker, Sir Reginald Blomfield and Charles Holden."

The place is important because of its aesthetic significance.

"The Atherton War Cemetery is an evocative site that conveys the distinctive aesthetic qualities and solemn ambience essential to all Imperial (later Commonwealth) War Graves Commission cemeteries. The formality of the War Cemetery – with its Cross of Sacrifice and uniform white marble headstones arranged in a regular pattern within a manicured lawn and horticultural border – make it a prominent feature distinguishable from the less formalised layout of the general cemetery."
