= Wunjunga, Queensland =

Wunjunga
- Suburb
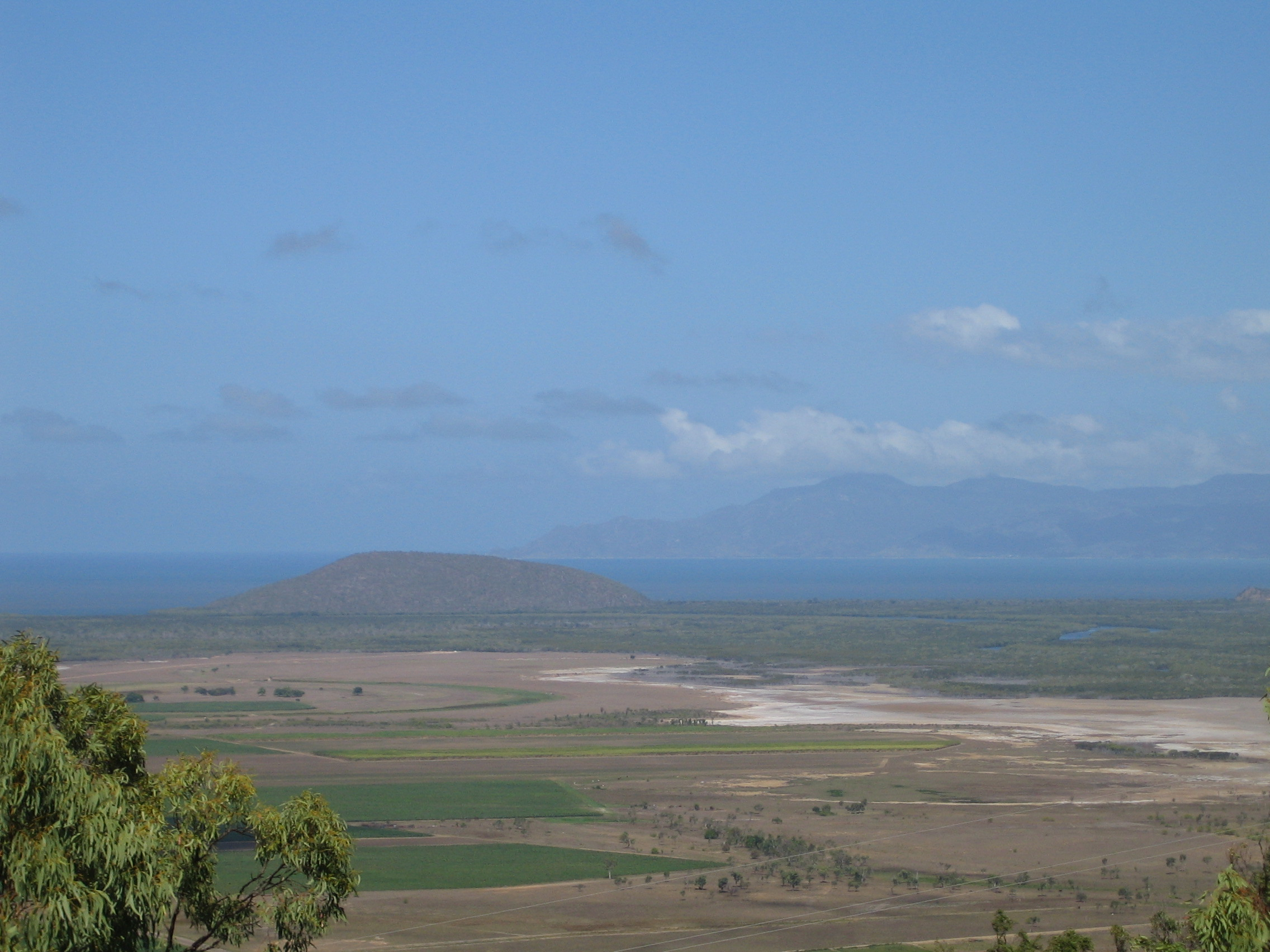
- Looking across Wunjunga to Beach Hill and Upstart Bay from Mount Inkerman, 2005

- Interactive map of Wunjunga
- Coordinates: 19.7744°S 147.5772°E
- Country: Australia
- State: Queensland
- LGA: Shire of Burdekin
- Location: 32.6 km (20.3 mi) SE of Home Hill; 44.1 km (27.4 mi) SE of Ayr; 130 km (81 mi) SE of Townsville; 1,255 km (780 mi) NNW of Brisbane

Government
  - State electorate: Burdekin
  - Federal division: Dawson

Area
  - Total: 71.1 km^{2} (27.5 sq mi)

Population
  - Total: 13 (2021 census)
  - Density: 0.183/km^{2} (0.474/sq mi)
- Time zone: UTC+10:00 (AEST)
- Postcode: 4806
Suburbs around Wunjunga
Inkerman	Groper Creek	Coral Sea
Wangaratta	Wunjunga	Coral Sea
Gumlu	Gumlu	Coral Sea

Wunjunga is a coastal locality in the Shire of Burdekin in Queensland, Australia. In the 2021 census, Wunjunga had a population of 13 people.

== Geography ==
Wunjunga is located south of Home Hill in North Queensland. The coastal waters of Upstart Bay (19.751°S 147.691°E) in the Coral Sea form the eastern boundary of the locality.

Saltwater Creek enters the locality from the west (Wangaratta) and forms the north-western boundary of the locality, until its confluence with Yellow Gin Creek, which then forms the northern boundary of the locality until it flows into Upstart Bay. Yellow Gin Creek also enters the locality from the (Wangaratta).

Beach Hill rises to 149 metres (489 ft) above sea level on the northern headland of the locality (19.7299°S 147.5858°E) between Yellow Gin Creek and Upstart Bay. Apart from this hill, the locality is low-lying (close to sea level) and is mostly marshland.

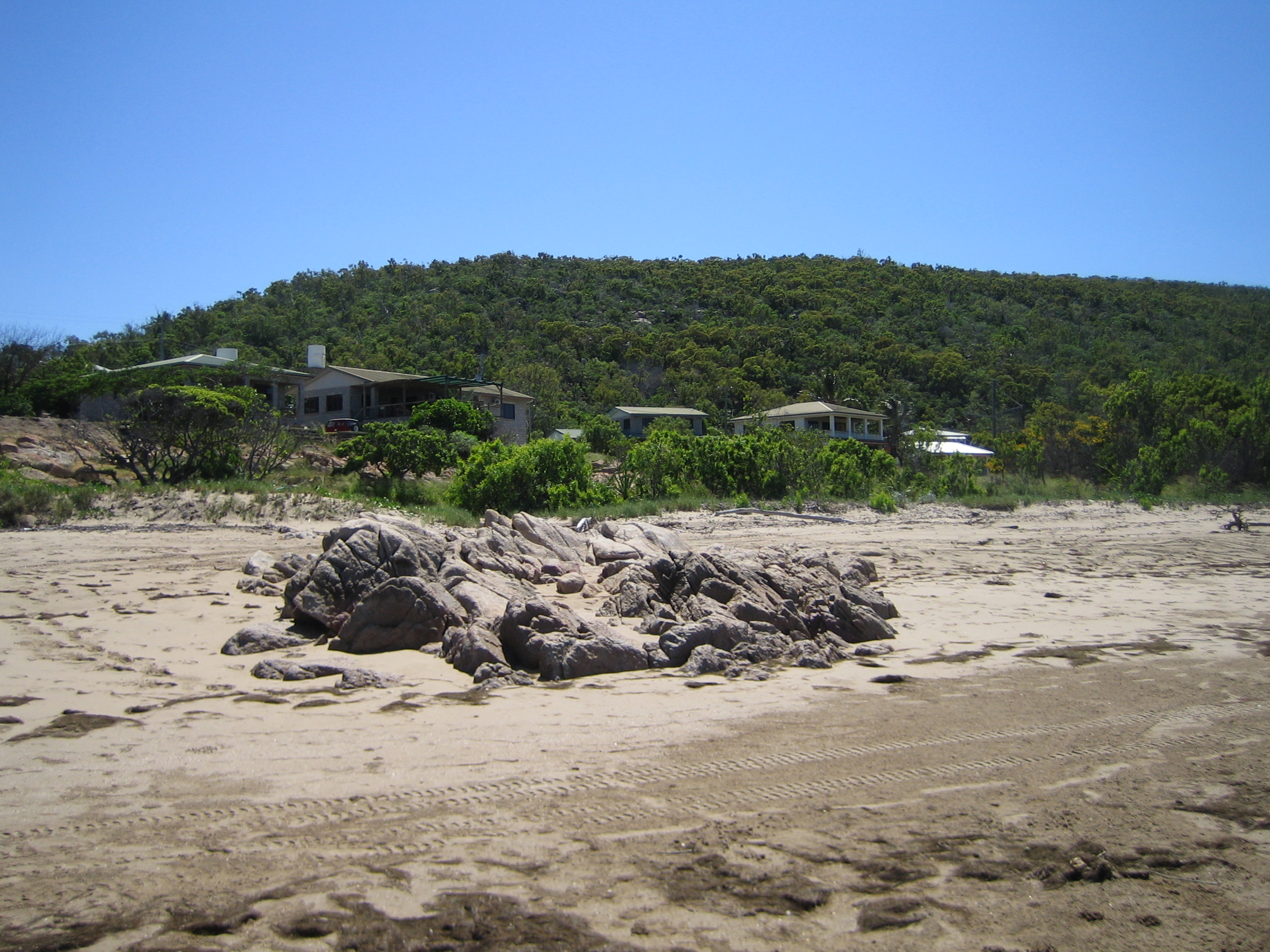
Housing near Beach Hill viewed from the beach at Upstart Bay with its rock formations, 2006

The Bruce Highway enters the locality from the south (Gumlu), forms the western boundary of the locality, and then exits to the north-west (Wangaratta / Inkerman). Beachmount Road commences at the highway and travels east to the coast and then turns north as Wunjunga Road to the Beach Hill area where there is a cluster of housing including holiday homes close to the beach.

There is limited land use due to the extent of the marshland. Apart from the housing near Beach Hiil, there is some crop growing and grazing on native vegetation in the west of the locality near to the highway and some further grazing on small pockets of land within the marshland.

== History ==
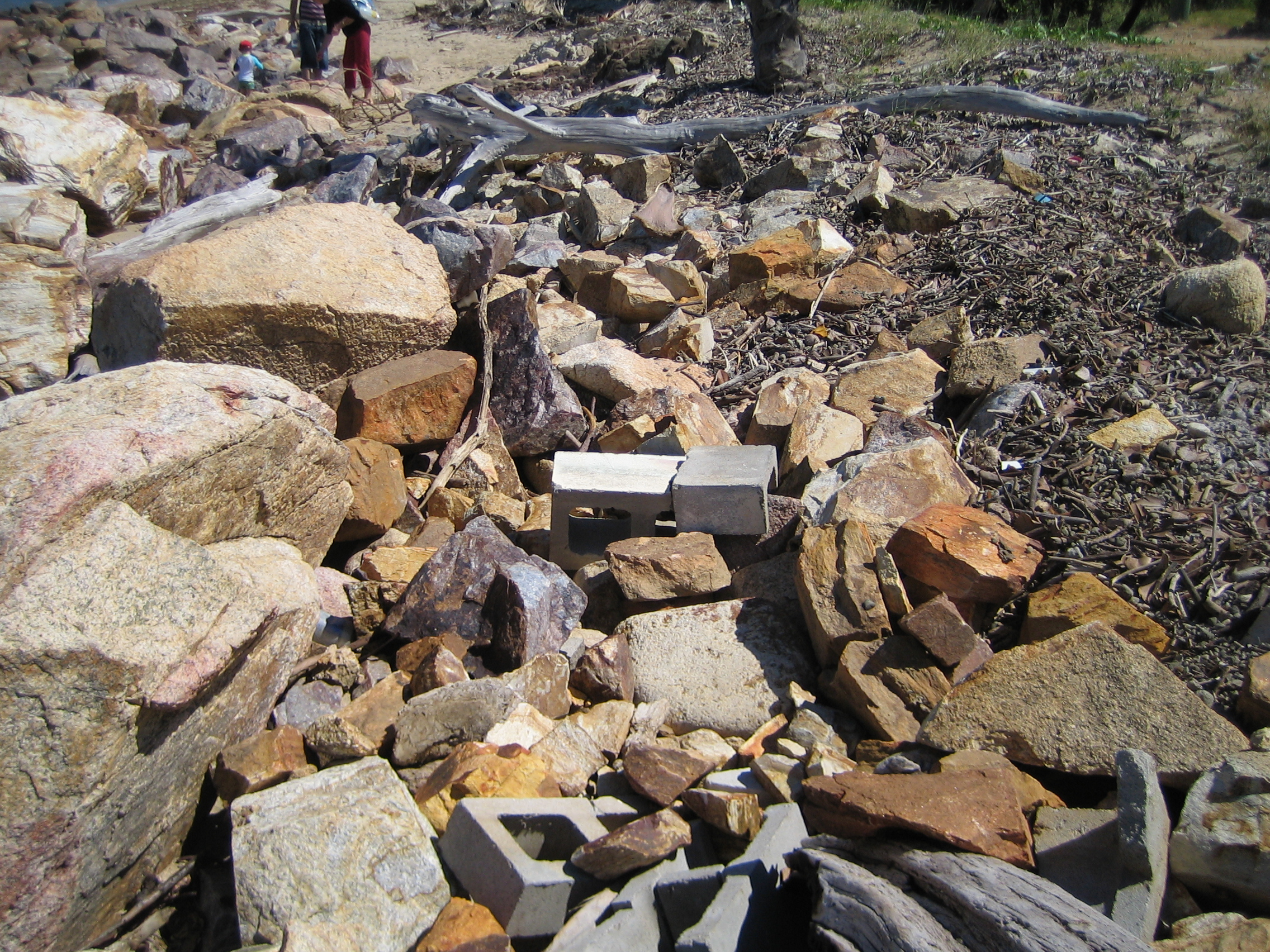
In 2006, rubble still litters the beach some 17 years after Cyclone Aivu hit in 1989

On 4 April 1989, Cyclone Aivu made landfall at Upstart Bay, creating a storm surge that flooded the low-lying coastline of the bay. At Wunjunga, fishermen's huts along on the beach at Wunjunga were destroyed during the storm.

== Demographics ==
In the 2016 census, Wunjunga had a population of 9 people.

In the 2021 census, Wunjunga had a population of 13 people.

== Education ==
There are no schools in Wunjunga. The nearest government primary schools are Gumlu State School in neighbouring Gumlu to the south and Home Hill State School in Home Hill to the north-west. The nearest government secondary school is Home Hill State High School, also in Home Hill.

There are also a Catholic primary school in Home Hill and a number of primary and secondary non-government schools in Ayr to the north.

== Attractions ==
The coastline at Wunjunga is informally known as Wunjunga Beach (or Beachmount) and is approximately 14 kilometres (8.7 mi) of sand and suitable for four-wheel driving, picnics, fishing and walks. Local wildlife can be seen along Beachmount / Wunjunga Road.

Short-term camping is available at the Funny Dunny Park camping groundson Wungunga Road (19.7523°S 147.5958°E).
