= Carstairs, Queensland =

Carstairs
- Suburb
- Interactive map of Carstairs
- Coordinates: 19.6505°S 147.4525°E
- Country: Australia
- State: Queensland
- LGA: Shire of Burdekin
- Location: 6.5 km (4.0 mi) E of Home Hill; 16.4 km (10.2 mi) S of Ayr; 102 km (63 mi) SE of Townsville; 1,271 km (790 mi) NNW of Brisbane

Government
  - State electorate: Burdekin
  - Federal division: Dawson

Area
  - Total: 36.0 km^{2} (13.9 sq mi)

Population
  - Total: 91 (2021 census)
  - Density: 2.528/km^{2} (6.55/sq mi)
- Time zone: UTC+10:00 (AEST)
- Postcode: 4806
Suburbs around Carstairs
McDesme	Jarvisfield	Rita Island
Home Hill	Carstairs	Rita Island
Home Hill	Inkerman	Inkerman

Carstairs is a rural locality in the Shire of Burdekin, Queensland, Australia. In the 2021 census, Carstairs had a population of 91 people.

== Geography ==
The Burdekin River forms the northern and eastern boundaries of the locality. The land use is predominantly growing sugarcane which is processed at the Inkerman Sugar Mill in neighbouring Home Hill.

The mill operates a cane tramway network to transport the sugarcane to the mill.

== History ==
The locality was named and bounded on 23 February 2001.

== Demographics ==
In the 2016 census, Carstairs had a population of 117 people.

In the 2021 census, Carstairs had a population of 91 people.

== Education ==
There are no school in Carstairs. The nearest government primary and secondary schools are Home Hill State School and Home Hill State High School, both in neighbouring Home Hill to the west.
