= Groper Creek, Queensland =

Groper Creek
- Town
- Interactive map of Groper Creek
- Coordinates: 19.6919°S 147.53°E
- Country: Australia
- State: Queensland
- LGA: Shire of Burdekin
- Location: 15.5 km (9.6 mi) ESE of Home Hill; 27.7 km (17.2 mi) SE of Ayr; 112 km (70 mi) SE of Townsville; 1,238 km (769 mi) NNW of Brisbane
- Established: 1921

Government
  - State electorate: Burdekin
  - Federal division: Dawson

Area
  - Total: 50.0 km^{2} (19.3 sq mi)

Population
  - Total: 66 (2021 census)
  - Density: 1.320/km^{2} (3.419/sq mi)
- Time zone: UTC+10:00 (AEST)
- Postcode: 4806
Localities around Groper Creek
Rita Island	Rita Island	Rita Island
Inkerman	Groper Creek	Coral Sea
Inkerman	Wunjunga	Wunjunga

Groper Creek is a coastal town and rural locality in the Shire of Burdekin, Queensland, Australia. In the 2021 census, the locality of Groper Creek had a population of 66 people.

== Geography ==
The locality is bounded by the Burdekin River to the north and by the Coral Sea to the east. Groper Creek is a distributary of the Burdekin River delta, splitting from the river at the north-western corner of the locality (19.6716°S 147.5105°E) and then flowing south-east towards the creek mouth at the Coral Sea (19.7143°S 147.5883°E), about 3.3 kilometres (2.1 mi) south of the mouth of the Burdekin River (19.6884°S 147.6060°E).

The southern part of the locality is part of the mainland but the northern part of the locality is part of the delta and comprises a number of islands, the largest being:

- Big Patterson Island (19.6783°S 147.5466°E)
- Peters Island (19.6963°S 147.5719°E)

Much of the locality is unused marshland but there is some grazing on native vegetation on Big Patterson Island and other areas.

The town of Groper Creek is located on the mainland on the western edge of the locality and is accessed via Groper Creek Road which passes through neighbouring Inkerman to Home Hill.

The Speter Island Cattle Farm is a 235.122-hectare (581.00-acre) farm that includes 65 hectares (160 acres) on the mainland (directly south of the town) and extends across the creek Groper Creek onto Peters Island where there are 140 hectares (350 acres) of usable land. The herd of Droughtmaster/Senepol cross cattle swim across the creek when they wish to graze on the other side. As at May 2019, none of the cattle have been taken by the crocodiles in the creek.

== History ==
In 1873 the Queensland Government reserved 10 acres 1 rood for a landing place on Heath's Creek. In that era, Heath Creek was a distributary of the Burdekin River and its mouth (19.7234°S 147.5785°E) provided access to boats to travel up the river, not possible from the river mouth. A wharf was built on Health Creek in 1883. However, changes to the delta over time resulted in Health Creek no longer being usable. So in 1921 a new landing area was established on Groper Creek which was a natural inlet off the Coral Sea that became a distributary of the Burdekin River following the floods in 1918. By 1924, it had become a popular fishing spot.

There were numerous crocodiles seen in the area in the 1930s but many of them were shot. Crocodile hunting was not prohibited in Queensland until 1974, the last jurisdiction within Australia to do so. Although their numbers are reduced, they are still seen in the creek.

For many years, the settlement of Groper Creek was not an official place name, but was a widely used and well-known local name. On 28 November 2018 it officially became a town and locality. The name comes from the creek of the same name.

== Demographics ==
In the 2016 census, the locality of Groper Creek had a population of 62 people.

In the 2021 census, the locality of Groper Creek had a population of 66 people.

== Amenities ==
There is a caravan park in the town on Hinkson Esplanade on the southern bank of the creek (19.6910°S 147.5312°E).

There are two public boat ramps into the creek Groper Creek on either side of a public jetty in the town at Hinkson Esplanade (19.6917°S 147.5317°E). There is also the Wallace Landing boat ramp into Alma Creek further south (19.7359°S 147.5561°E) accessed via Peak Road in Inkerman.

== Education ==
There are no schools in Groper Creek. The nearest government primary school is Home Hill State School in Home Hill to the west. The nearest government secondary school is Home Hill State High School in Home Hill.
