= Radar Station, Charlie's Hill =

Radar station in Australia

Charlie's Hill Radar Station
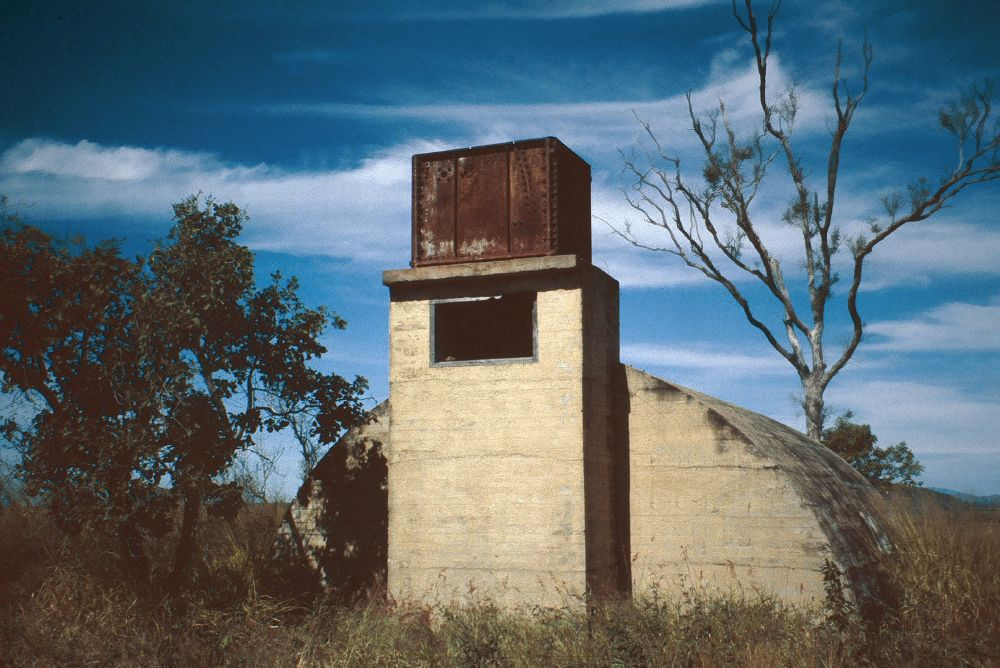
- Radar Station, Charlie's Hill

- Location within Queensland Location within Australia
- 19.7089°S 147.4632°E
- Location: Off Charlie's Hill Road, Inkerman, Shire of Burdekin, Queensland, Australia

History
- Design period: 1939–1945 (World War II)
- Built: 1943

Queensland Heritage Register
- Official name: Radar Station, Charlie's Hill
- Type: state heritage (built, archaeological)
- Designated: 23 February 2001
- Reference no.: 601716
- Significant period: 1943 (fabric); 1943–1945 (historical)
- Significant components: footings, bunker – concrete, observation post (military)
- Builders: Royal Australian Air Force

Charlie's Hill Radar Station is a heritage-listed radar station off Charlie's Hill Road, Inkerman, Shire of Burdekin, Queensland, Australia. It was built in 1943 by Royal Australian Air Force. It was added to the Queensland Heritage Register on 23 February 2001.

== History ==
The Charlie's Hill Radio Direction and Ranging (RADAR) Station, located south of the town of Home Hill, was constructed in 1943 as part of the World War II defences mounted in north Queensland. It was constructed by the Royal Australian Air Force (RAAF).

With the imminent threat of war with Japan in the Pacific the Australian Government had been looking to the resources of north Queensland from the late 1930s. Following the declaration of war on Japan on 9 December 1941, Japan launched simultaneous attacks on Hawaii, Hong Kong and Malaya. Immediate action was taken to construct military installations in north Queensland. The bombing of Darwin (March 1942) and Townsville (July 1942) and the arrival of American troops in the north (from March 1942) accelerated plans to establish facilities in the area. However the shifting of the war to New Guinea in May 1942 intensified the military presence in the area as the important role the north would play in the defence against Japan was recognised. Radar stations were established along the north Queensland coast during WWII to give the earliest possible warning of approaching enemy aircraft. The RAAF installed No 211 Radar Station on Charlie's Hill in late 1943. It was one of twenty radar installations established along the north Queensland coastline. Whilst many were established in remote locations, the station at Charlie's Hill was located near the town of Home Hill just south of the Burdekin River.

The installation, known as a 200 Series, fixed ground "high flying" radar station was one of only two of this type located in north Queensland (the other being No 220 at Bones Knob, Tolga). The 211 Radar Station utilised British Advanced Chain Overseas (ACO) equipment, operated in the HF band at 42.05 megacycles per second, which is a wave length of about 7 metres (23 ft), and had height finding capabilities. Two 186-foot (57 m) wooden towers, which were assembled in kit form, stood approximately 100 metres (330 ft) apart, and supported the transmitting and receiving aerials. The equipment was housed in two above ground semi-circular bomb-proof igloos constructed of reinforced concrete. The eastern igloo housed the receiving equipment whilst the western igloo housed the transmitting equipment. It is believed that these igloos were designed to be built underground, with a short access tower at the end, although the tower would have also provided much needed ventilation. Other services provided at the site include a camp-site of huts, mess and toilet facilities and a power generator. These were constructed at the base of the hill on the north-western side.

The No 211 Radar Station was maintained and operated by a radar unit made up of members of the RAAF and Women's Auxiliary Australian Air Force (WAAAF). The radar units were usually small, numbering around 35 personnel. The station was operated for 24-hours a day with the shifts usually divided into three eight-hour shifts - day, evening and night. Each shift comprised three-four people - one recording the incoming messages, one working on the plotting table, one operator, and a fourth person to operate the telephone. During a shift the personnel would rotate every two hours, to help break up the monotony of the work. The RAAF staff, who lived on site, maintained and operated the station. The WAAAF staff, who worked as operators, plotters, and recorders, were on site during daylight hours only. The WAAAF personnel were accommodated in the hotel at Home Hill.

Following the surrender of Japan in August 1945 military installations in north Queensland were disbanded. The Charlie's Hill Radar Station ceased operating on 1 October 1945. The equipment was dismantled and removed. Before leaving the area, the officers and operators of the unit, in return for the hospitality of the Home Hill residents, hosted a tennis afternoon, dinner and dance in the town.

Since the end of World War II, the site of the No 211 Radar Station, Charlie's Hill has been maintained by the Burdekin Tourism Association as a local tourist attraction.

== Description ==
The No 211 Radar Station is located south of Home Hill by way of the Bruce Highway, turn east into Charlie's Hill Road and travel 2 kilometres (1.2 mi), turn right onto an unsealed track, which leads up to the radar station on top of a small hill, known as Charlie's Hill. To the north-east are Rita Island and Peters Island. The physical remains of the radar station comprise two above ground semi-circular igloos, two spotter's posts, tower foundations and miscellaneous concrete foundations.

The two above ground semi-circular igloos were built on concrete slab foundations and are constructed of reinforced concrete. Each igloo has a tower located at one end, which is believed to have been utilised as an exhaust, with fans drawing in fresh air from the front of the igloo and sucking it out the tower opening. The two igloos are approximately 80 metres (260 ft) apart.

The eastern (receiving) igloo is approximately 10 metres (33 ft) long x 6 metres (20 ft) wide. Along the base of the north-east side wall (rear) of the igloo is a small timber framed opening. There is an opening on the southern side, approximately 2 metres (6 ft 7 in) wide, which would have been the door. The door is no longer extant. Anecdotal evidence indicates that the door was staggered ie. enter one side, walk around one partition, and then another, like an s-bend, to ensure that light was contained inside the igloo at all times. This would also have provided a constant flow of air into the igloo, which was then drawn through the igloo by an exhaust fan situated in the tower. There is a square steel box on top of the tower inscribed with the words "A & W... & Co LTD ENGINNEERS [sic?] GLASGOW". It is not known what this was used for. The interior of the igloo is bare, except for a modern lounge chair and some rubbish.

The remains of four square concrete footings, approximately 1.5 by 1.5 metres (4 ft 11 in × 4 ft 11 in), of the wooden tower, which carried the receiving aerial, are located approximately 10 metres (33 ft) to the east of the igloo.

To the north east of the footings is the remains of a "spotters post" - a chest height, concrete lined hole in the ground. This was operated by member of the Voluntary Air Observers' Corps (VAOC) whose role was to sight air and sea craft visually to confirm radar readings. The telescope is no longer extant.

North of the receiving igloo are two small concrete foundations, their purpose is unknown.

The western (transmitting) igloo is approximately 10 metres (33 ft) long x 6 metres (20 ft) wide. The interior of the igloo is bare. Exit holes for the aerial cables are evidenced in the concrete floor. There is a small opening in the floor on the north-west corner (rear) of the igloo approximately 2 metres (6 ft 7 in) long x 0.5 metres (1 ft 8 in) wide. It contains modern rubbish.

To the west of the igloo are four square concrete foundations, approximately 1.5 by 1.5 metres (4 ft 11 in × 4 ft 11 in), which are the foundations of the wooden tower, which housed the transmitting aerials.

Located in the middle of the tower foundations is a chest-height, concrete lined hole, the remains of another 'spotter's post'. Due to heavy grass cover this was not located during the 2000 survey.

Other infrastructure associated with the site including a smaller igloo situated at the base of the hill, which is believed to have contained a diesel alternator to power the station, were not located during the 2000 survey.

== Heritage listing ==
Radar Station, Charlie's Hill was listed on the Queensland Heritage Register on 23 February 2001 having satisfied the following criteria.

The place is important in demonstrating the evolution or pattern of Queensland's history.

The No 211 Radar Station, Charlie's Hill a complex comprising two semi-circular igloos, spotter's posts and tower foundations, is important in demonstrating the pattern of Queensland's history by representing the role it played in World War II fortifications in north Queensland.

The place has potential to yield information that will contribute to an understanding of Queensland's history.

The No 211 Radar Station, Charlie's Hill is a good example of defence facilities constructed in north Queensland and has the potential to yield further information about this aspect of Queensland history. It is one of a series of radar stations, which were constructed along the Queensland coastline to give the earliest possible warning of approaching enemy aircraft.

The place is important in demonstrating the principal characteristics of a particular class of cultural places.

The station, in its design, layout and siting, demonstrates the principal characteristics of WWII military installations involved in the defence of the Queensland coastline.
