= Rocky Creek World War Two Hospital Complex =

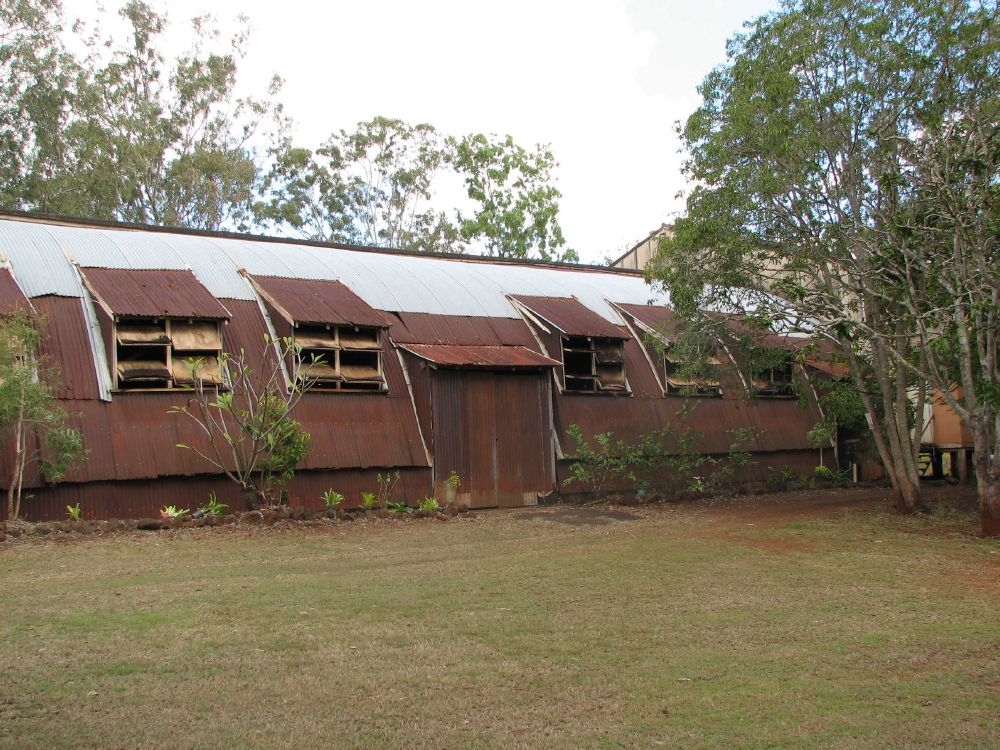
- Rocky Creek World War Two Hospital Complex

- Location within Queensland Location within Australia
- 17.1886°S 145.4594°E
- Location: Kennedy Highway, Tolga, Tablelands Region, Queensland, Australia

History
- Design period: 1939–1945 (World War II)
- Built: October 1942 – September 1945

Queensland Heritage Register
- Official name: Rocky Creek World War Two Hospital Complex (former)
- Type: state heritage (built, archaeological)
- Designated: 25 February 2000
- Reference no.: 601815
- Significant period: 1942–1945 (fabric and historical)
- Significant components: road/roadway, pathway/walkway, garden – bed/s, igloo, plantings – exotic, slab/s – concrete
- Builders: T J Watkins Pty Ltd

Rocky Creek World War Two Hospital Complex is a heritage-listed military hospital at Kennedy Highway, Tolga, Tablelands Region, Queensland, Australia. It was initially built in October 1942, with further construction continuing over the course of much of World War II. It was added to the Queensland Heritage Register on 25 February 2000.

== History ==
The Rocky Creek World War II Hospital Complex was in operation from October 1942 until September 1945 as part of the medical installations established in North Queensland during World War II. Some 30,000 patients were treated at this facility in almost three years.

In the 1930s, the threat of war with Japan became imminent. As Japanese aggression moved across the Pacific in the early 1940s, a military presence in North Queensland gradually intensified. The Australian Army first began investigating the resources of North Queensland in the late 1930s, and when war was declared on Japan on 9 December 1941, the construction of military installations began immediately. The bombing of Darwin (March 1942) and Townsville (July 1942), and the arrival of American troops in the north (from March 1942), added further impetus to the establishment of facilities in the area. When hostilities extended to Papua New Guinea in May 1942, the military presence in the north intensified further still.

The installation of medical infrastructure on the Rocky Creek site commenced on 6 October 1942, with the arrival of the 19th Field Ambulance from Calcium. They were charged with the preparation of a camp for the 5th Australian Camp Hospital (ACH). The 5th ACH arrived at Rocky Creek from Redbank on 14 October 1942. The Commanding Officer, Lt-Col LA Little (AAMC), and Matron K Cahill, assisted by several nursing sisters and a few male orderlies, established a small camp hospital on the south eastern side of Rocky Creek. Their duties complete, the 19th Field Ambulance left Rocky Creek on 17 October 1942 to set up camp just outside of Kuranda, where an Advanced Dressing Station (ADS) was to be established.

Over the next few weeks, activity at the site increased. The first patients were admitted on 20 October 1942, and were joined the next day by more patients when the 1st Australian Camp hospital left Wondecla and removed its patients to Rocky Creek. 2 November saw the arrival of the 1st Australian Mobile Laundry Unit, while 20 VADs (later AAMWS) commenced duties on 14 November, providing much needed nursing support.

In January 1943, an advance party of 2/2nd Army General Hospital (AGH) AIF arrived at the Rocky Creek Hospital site, signifying a new phase in the hospital's development, and an intensification of activity. The 2/2nd AGH AIF replaced the 5th AGH, which moved the next day, 5 January 1943, to a new hospital unit established at the North Cairns State School. The 2/2nd AGH, under the command of Colonel Talbert, the Commanding Officer, and Matron, Miss Jean Oddie, launched into the arduous task of expanding the small tent hospital into a large 1200 bed General Hospital. On 20 April 1943, they were joined by the 2/6th AGH AIF, which, after serving two years in the Middle East (Greece, Crete, Jerusalem and Gaza), arrived back in Australia to find themselves transferred to Rocky Creek.

Patients treated at the Rocky Creek Hospitals usually arrived in Cairns from Papua New Guinea, to be transported to Rocky Creek by the 4th Australian Hospital Ambulance Train. The train ran three times a week.

The Rocky Creek Hospital Complex covered a site of 763 acres, encompassing private land purchased by the Australian Military Forces, and Crown Land. The Complex initially consisted of the 2/2nd AGH, the 2/6th AGH, the Mobile Laundry Administration Area, the 2/1st Australian Convalescent Depot, and associated medical installations. The 1200 bed 2/2nd AGH was constructed by a local Cairns firm, TJ Watkins PTY Ltd at a cost of £143 667. There were 73 buildings in total, including facilities for the 4th Australian Static Laundry. The Entertainment Igloo, recreation hut and warehouses were also constructed by Watkin and PR Ayre, at a cost of £2796. The 1200 bed hospital of the 2/6th AGH was built by AH Hodge and Sons of Toowoomba, while the 600 bed 2/1st Convalescent Depot was constructed by Clive Kynaston of Cairns.

Both the 2/2nd and the 2/6th Hospitals employed a similar layout and were constructed using similar materials. The two hospitals consisted of 40 wards, offices, stores and other auxiliary buildings. The wards were laid out in pairs, with a service annexe in between. Most were constructed with canvas, and measures 60 by 20 feet (18.3 m × 6.1 m). Early wards had earth floors, watered daily to make them firm, and a rattan carpet down the middle aisle. Other buildings were constructed from timber and iron. Later wards were set on a concrete slab and had a capacity of approximately 50 patients. By March 1944, both hospitals had been transformed from tent to hut hospitals and the bed capacity had increased to 1400, however, by September 1944 the daily bed average had increased to 1760. The buildings still had canvas walls but the floors were concrete and each ward had its own amenities, such as a wood stove, kerosene refrigerator, a permanent toilet and an office and dressing room. In October 1944, electricity supply, originally generator powered, switched to mains power, supplied by the Barron Falls Hydro Electricity Board.

The concrete ward floors consisted of reinforced concrete slabs varying in thickness. The annexes were bordered and partitioned by concrete wall bases, from which protruded metal wall ties. The concrete wall bases were slightly flanged on either side. On these flanges would have rested sheets of asbestos cement which formed the walls. They were probably nailed at the base to a wooden runner which would have sat on top of the wall base. The metal ties probably passed through the wood and continued up between the walls to the roof, or were bent over the wood if not in use. Where the asbestos cement sheets met the concrete, cover strips would have been nailed. Scatters of pieces of these cover strips are found over most of the site.

One of the wards in the 2/2nd AGH was the Malaria Experimental Ward. Participants involved in the experiments were all volunteers, and the trials involved groups of 5–6 volunteers being injected with parasites from the Anopheles mosquito which carries the malaria virus. Treatments were confidential and all volunteers signed a statement absolving the Army and medical staff of responsibility for any side effects.

While the work hours for staff at the Hospital Complex were long, various facilities were provided for their enjoyment in the leisure time available. The complex included an open-air picture show, where bingo was often played before the main feature. There was also a log-cabin recreational room and a tennis court with an ant-bed floor which was utilised by both patients and medical staff. Others spent their time planting garden beds outside their quarters and the hospital wards. Movies were shown in the Entertainment Igloo, constructed in 1943. A truck, with a projector on the back, would reverse up to the building along the built up driveway, so that the projector pointed towards the screen. Concerts and dances were also held in the building.

The staged closure of the Rocky Creek Hospital Complex began in 1944, and continued through to 1945. The 2/6th AGH was the first to close, in October 1944, followed by the 2/2nd AGH on 30 September 1945, which subsequently moved to Darley (Victoria). Following the end of the war, military buildings at Rocky Creek were auctioned and either dismantled or relocated. Some are to be found in the district today, having been purchased by local residents and farmers. Portions of land were sold as freehold allotments and many were subsequently converted to agricultural use. The Entertainment Igloo was purchased by Frank and Ellen Frazer in 1947. The stage was converted into a family home, in which the Frazers raised their 11 children. Mr Frazer manufactured cane furniture in the auditorium. Following the death of her husband, Mrs Frazer stayed on at the igloo until ill health forced her to move to Cairns in 1995. The igloo and land were donated to the Atherton Shire Council.

In the lead up to the 50th anniversary of victory in the Pacific celebrations in 1995, a War Memorial Park was established on the former site of the Mobile Laundry Administration Area through the efforts of a group of local residents. Various memorials, a flag pole, interpretive shelter and a sheltered park bench have been erected at the Park. Anzac Day commemorative ceremonies are now conducted at the park, while the remains of the Rocky Creek site are often visited by locals and visitors to the area where either they, or a relative, spent time at the hospital during the Second World War. It was also intended that the local Tolga State School use the Memorial Park for the purposes of education, in particular to develop an understanding among students of the importance of the Rocky Creek Hospital Complex during the Second World War.

== Description ==
The Rocky Creek World War II Hospital Complex site consists of the Entertainment Igloo and building remnants of the 2/2nd AGH, located on Frazer Road Reserve.

=== Entertainment Igloo ===
The Rocky Creek Igloo is located on the southern side of the Kennedy Highway, approximately five kilometres north of Tolga. The World War II building is nearly rectangular in plan, 42.6 metres (140 ft) in length and 22 metres (72 ft) wide at its widest point. It is composed of two major elements: an "igloo" which formed the auditorium of the theatre; and the stage and backstage area.

The igloo has a curved auditorium roof 34 metres (112 ft) long, and has an overall width of 17.4 metres (57 ft) and a clear internal span of 16.8 metres (55 ft). The interior space is 6.4 metres (21 ft) high to the top of the trusses, and the roof projects about a metre higher as a low-pitched gable to an overall height of about 7.5 metres (25 ft).

The entire igloo stands on a concrete slab foundation about 18 by 34 metres (59 by 112 ft) in plan, with a raised kerb and two external drains running along the building's long sides, and twenty cast concrete feet which support the trusses. There are ten trusses spanning the interior space. Each is composed of two curved half-trusses which are pinned at the foundations and at the apex where they meet: a three-pin truss system. The trusses are made entirely of sawn pieces of native hardwood nailed together.

The roof of the igloo is clad with corrugated iron, the centre section of which has been angled up into a low-pitched gable. Rafters and the upper chords of the trusses support timber purlins, to which the corrugated iron is nailed. There is a ventilating gap in the roof above the centreline, protected by a raised sheetmetal ridge capping which is semi-circular in section. The curved roof has no guttering; water simply runs off into concrete drains on either side of the building.

Most of the interior of the auditorium is one large clear space. There are seven major ground-level openings into the auditorium, all symmetrically positioned. In the centre of the front wall are large double doors in the midpoint and at the rear end of each side wall, all protected by small skillion roofs. The rear doors are fitted with theatre exit bolts made by J Adams and Son of Sydney.

Along each side of the curved wall there are seven dormer windows with iron sides and skillion roofs, fitted with horizontally-pivoting window panes of Caneite. The only glass in the auditorium is in four small casement windows in the front wall. Low down on the side walls there is a horizontal opening in the iron for ventilation.

The stage and backstage area are housed in a more conventional timber-framed building with a gabled roof, which rises to about 9 metres (30 ft) above the ground at the ridge. It was built as a symmetrical structure continuing the centreline of the auditorium and it extends 8.6 metres (28 ft) along that axis and projects out sideways beyond the sides of the auditorium to 22 metres (72 ft) wide. The stage building is clad externally on its walls and roof with corrugated asbestos cement sheeting. The stage floor is elevated about a metre above the ground.

The entire structure of the stage building appears to be of sawn hardwood, framed with vertical studs and horizontal rails. Some interior walls are lined with vertical tongue and groove boards, and the entire proscenium around the stage is faced with selected vertical boards, left unpainted. The quality of the original carpentry is very good.

Post-war modifications to the backstage area include the partitioning of the stage itself with a stud framed wall just behind the proscenium, and two small partitioned rooms located at the rear of the stage. A small external room in front of the toilet in the western corner is a further post-war addition. All partitions and additions are timber-framed, and the rooms are lined and have ceilings of either asbestos cement sheeting or hardboard.

=== Frazer Road – Western Side ===
Frazer Road extends in a south-eastern direction from the Entertainment Igloo.

The western side of Frazer Road contains several concrete floors on a long gentle slope running parallel to the road. From the northern end and extending south, the following remnants can be identified.

The "Disinfectant Room", of which remains of the morgue can be identified. This includes a rectangular concrete floor with drain holes and two separate sewerage sumps, one on the north-eastern side and one on the east.

To the south-east of the disinfectant room, the remains of a bitumen road outcrop on the table drain at the edge of Frazer Road can be identified. This outcrop aligns with the road just south of the large cross-shaped ward.

Further south, remains of the "Dysentery Ward" include an elevated concrete slab with evidence of several walls and partitions. There are holes for drains and toilet outlets. There is a walkway leading down to the dysentery annexe (possible ablutions block). Marks in the concrete indicate that pans may have been used to supplement the toilets. There is a wing for beds running to the west and opposite that wing, to the east, there is another section of concrete floor that may have been another wing. The remains of garden beds are evident on either side of the western wing. There is a light glass, fibro and ceramic scatter surrounding the slab. At the northern corner is a sewerage inspection point. To the west-south-west is another, roughly in line with the end of the ward wing.

The remains of the "Psychiatric Ward" are located further up the slope. This is a cross-shaped ward. The north–south arm has a similar pattern of partitions, drains and toilet outlets to that of the Dysentery Ward. There are two simple wings to the east and west. Located close to the end of the western wing are the remains of a brick incinerator which has been relocated to this site. There is a sewerage inspection point on the north-east corner.

Remains of a bitumen road running roughly east–west are evident further along Frazer Road. This area has a scatter of artefacts including a drug bottle, and also a scatter of introduced garden plant species.

Further south are the remains of the "Venereal Disease Ward", another cross-shaped ward. The name "Hooks" has been scratched into the concrete of the annexe.

Twenty metres east of the VD Ward, in close proximity to Frazer Road, is another rectangular floor with no notable details. There is no known evidence of its former use.

To the south of the VD Ward are the remains of three concrete slabs that are slightly terraced. These are the remains of a former garden bed on either end of the southernmost terrace. The eastern edges of the northern concrete slab are crumbling badly. Further west is the remains of another concrete slab with an annexe running NNW-SE and a wing at right angles running south-west. This formed part of the Isolation Ward. It has been severely damaged by recent bulldozer activity.

East of the Isolation Ward and adjacent to Frazer Road is the remains of a small concrete floor with wall bases around the perimeter. The ground between the two elements contains a scatter of fibro, glass and ceramics.

=== Frazer Road – Eastern Side ===
This section of the road reserve between Frazer Road and the cane field contains a cleared strip for high tension wires. The integrity of the hospital site remains on this side of the road are fair; road construction activities associated with the construction of Frazer Road, and the clearing of the large strip for the power line have caused damage to the site.

The eastern side of the road reserve contains the remains of several concrete floors and other remnants on a series of low wide terraces running roughly east–west. A fallen pole with ceramic insulators, evidence of roadways, broken sewerage pipes and a drainage line were all identified on the site.

== Heritage listing ==
The former Rocky Creek World War Two Hospital Complex was listed on the Queensland Heritage Register on 25 February 2000 having satisfied the following criteria.

The place is important in demonstrating the evolution or pattern of Queensland's history.

The Rocky Creek World War II Hospital Complex is important in demonstrating the pattern of Queensland's history as an example of a World War II installation located in North Queensland. Being close to the Papua New Guinea battlefield, Queensland played a vital role hosting and supporting Australian and United States Servicemen. As a hospital complex, the site is significant for the role it played in the provision of medical treatment to these troops, including the use of new treatments and technology, and for the research conducted regarding the treatment of malaria.

The place demonstrates rare, uncommon or endangered aspects of Queensland's cultural heritage.

The Entertainment Igloo, constructed in 1943, demonstrates a rare aspect of Queensland's cultural heritage as one of the few remaining small igloos designed and operated as a theatre during World War II.

The place has potential to yield information that will contribute to an understanding of Queensland's history.

The Rocky Creek World War II Hospital Complex has the potential to yield information that will contribute to an understanding of Queensland's history. Concrete slabs and scatters of artefacts could reveal information about the technology used in temporary military buildings during World War II.

The place has a strong or special association with a particular community or cultural group for social, cultural or spiritual reasons.

The Rocky Creek World War II Hospital Complex has a special association with those who spent time at the facility during the Second World War for cultural and spiritual reasons.

The place has a special association with the life or work of a particular person, group or organisation of importance in Queensland's history.

The Rocky Creek World War II Hospital Complex has a special association with the work of the Australian Army Medical Women's Service (AAMWS) and with the important work of medical units, especially the Malaria Control Unit who developed new technology in Australia during World War II.
