= Inkerman, Queensland =

Town in Australia

Inkerman
- Town
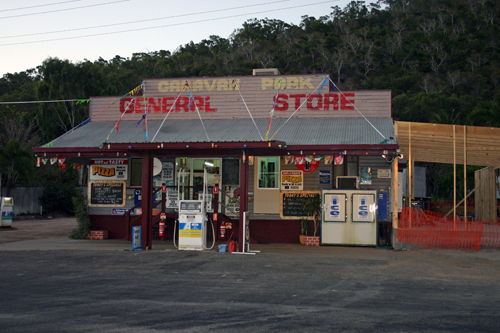
- Caravan Park General Store, 2010

- Interactive map of Inkerman
- Coordinates: 19.7508°S 147.4908°E
- Country: Australia
- State: Queensland
- LGA: Shire of Burdekin
- Location: 20.2 km (12.6 mi) S of Ayr; 105 km (65 mi) SE of Townsville; 1,237 km (769 mi) NNW of Brisbane

Government
  - State electorate: Burdekin
  - Federal division: Dawson

Area
  - Total: 85.7 km^{2} (33.1 sq mi)

Population
  - Total: 119 (2021 census)
  - Density: 1.389/km^{2} (3.596/sq mi)
- Time zone: UTC+10:00 (AEST)
- Postcode: 4806
Localities around Inkerman
| Home Hill | Carstairs | Rita Island |
| Fredericksfielld | Inkerman | Groper Creek |
| Wangaratta | Wunjunga | Wunjunga |

Inkerman is a rural town and locality in the Shire of Burdekin, Queensland, Australia. In the 2021 census, the locality of Inkerman had a population of 119 people.

== Geography ==
Inkerman is bounded to the west by the Bruce Highway and the North Coast railway line.

Although most of the locality is flat land (0-10 metres (33 ft) above sea level, Inkerman has the following mountains:

- Charlies Hill (19.7084°S 147.4637°E) 32 metres (105 ft)
- Mount Alma (19.7305°S 147.5175°E) 104 metres (341 ft)
- Mount Inkerman (19.7456°S 147.4957°E) 219 metres (719 ft)

The predominant land use is growing sugarcane with some grazing on native vegetation.

== History ==
Inkerman Post Office opened by 1915 as a receiving office (known for a time as Inkerman Siding) and closed in 1975.

Inkerman State School opened on 24 November 1915. It closed on 31 December 1974. It was at 22 Wallace Road (19.7513°S 147.4935°E). The school buildings were still on the site in January 2008,

== Demographics ==
In the 2016 census, the locality of Inkerman had a population of 520 people.

In the 2011 census, the locality of Inkerman had a population of 364 people.

In the 2016 census, the locality of Inkerman had a population of 145 people.

In the 2021 census, the locality of Inkerman had a population of 119 people.

== Heritage listings ==
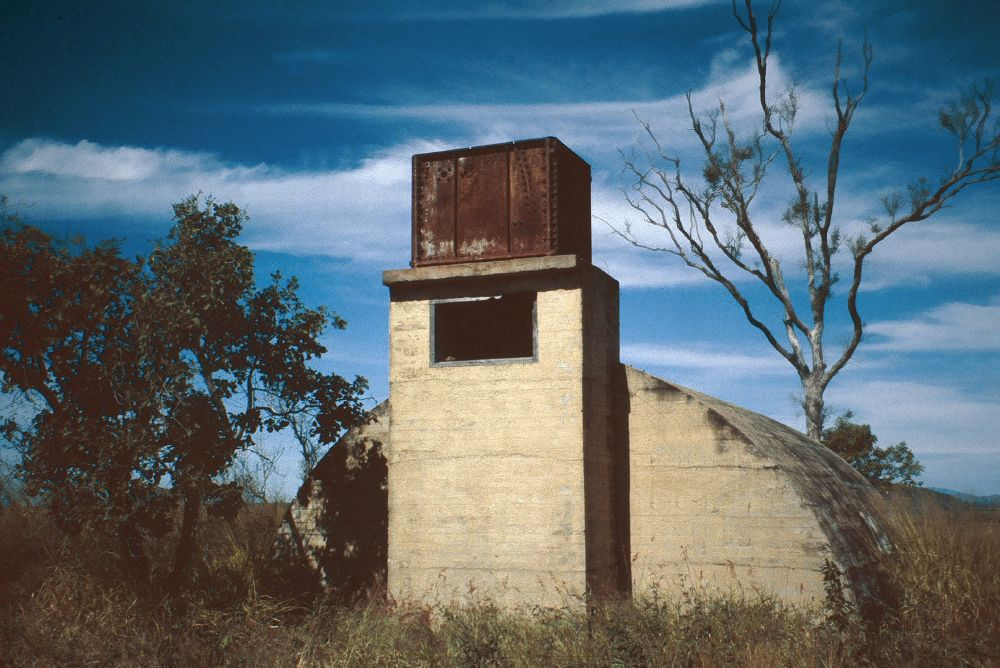
Radar station

Inkerman has a number of heritage-listed sites, including:

- Off Charlie's Hill Road (19.7089°S 147.4632°E): Radar Station, Charlie's Hill

== Education ==
There are no schools in Inkerman. The nearest government schools are Home Hill State School (primary) and Home Hill State High School (secondary), both in neighbouring Home Hill to the north-west.

== Attractions ==
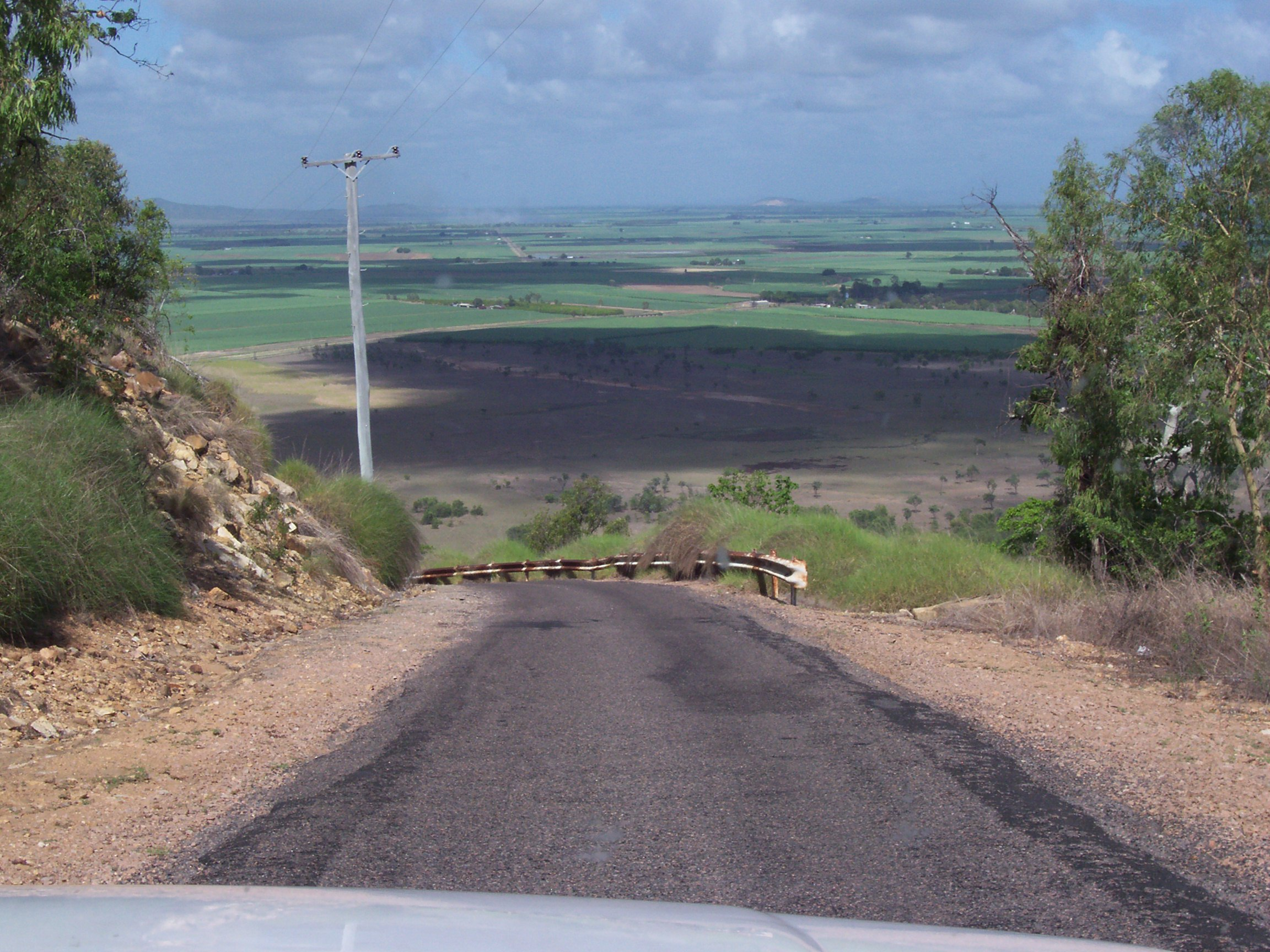
On the road down from the Mount Inkerman Lookout

At the top of Mount Inkerman there are views in all directions as well as picnic facilities. Mount Inkerman Road goes to the top of the mountain.

Charlies Hill also has views and the remains of the heritage-listed radar station. Access to the top is via an unsealed road off Charlies Hill Road.
