= Rita Island, Queensland =

Rita Island
- Suburb
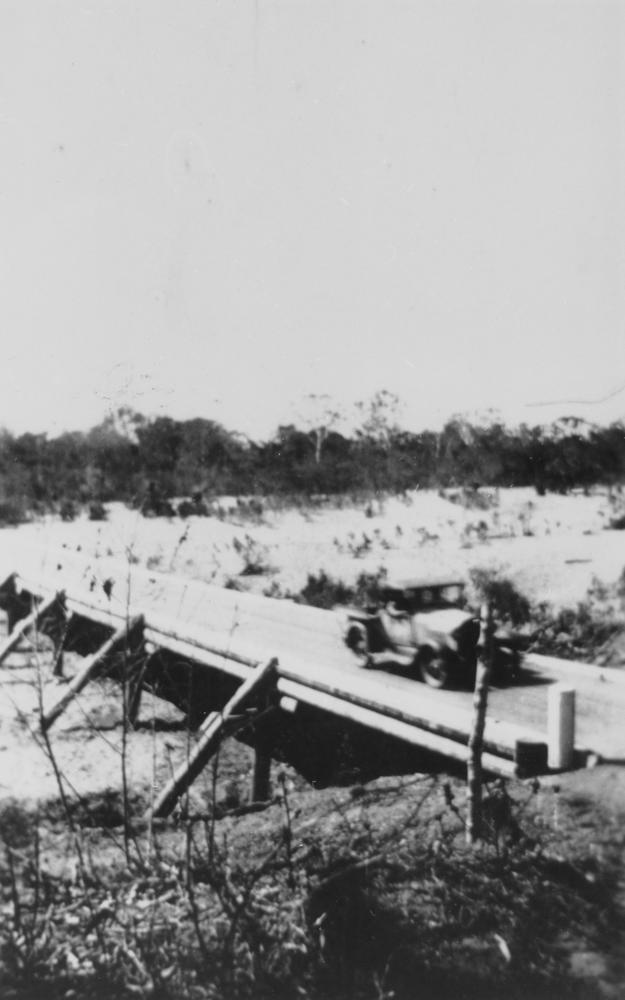
- Anabranch Bridge, connecting Rita Island to the mainland across the Burdekin River northern anabranch

- Interactive map of Rita Island
- Coordinates: 19.6320°S 147.5347°E
- Country: Australia
- State: Queensland
- LGA: Shire of Burdekin
- Location: 13.9 km (8.6 mi) SE of Ayr; 102 km (63 mi) SE of Townsville; 1,256 km (780 mi) NNW of Brisbane

Government
  - State electorate: Burdekin
  - Federal division: Dawson

Area
  - Total: 86.3 km^{2} (33.3 sq mi)

Population
  - Total: 172 (2021 census)
  - Density: 1.993/km^{2} (5.162/sq mi)
- Time zone: UTC+10:00 (AEST)
- Postcode: 4807
Suburbs around Rita Island
Jarvisfield	Jarvisfield	Coral Sea
Carstairs	Rita Island	Coral Sea
Inkerman	Groper Creek	Groper Creek

Rita Island is a coastal and rural locality in the Shire of Burdekin, Queensland, Australia. In the 2021 census, Rita Island had a population of 172 people.

== Geography ==
The Burdekin River breaks into two branches as it approaches the Coral Sea and Rita Island is the island that lies between the two branches.

Road and rail access is via the Anabranch Bridge across the northern anabranch (19.6253°S 147.4825°E), which can be inaccessible if the Burdekin River is in flood.

The land use is predominantly growing sugarcane. There is a cane tramway network to transport the harvested sugarcane to the Kalamia sugar mill in Brandon.

== Demographics ==
In the 2016 census, Rita Island had a population of 152 people.

In the 2021 census, Rita Island had a population of 172 people.

== Education ==
There are no schools in Rita Island. The nearest government primary school is Jarvisfield State School in neighbouring Jarvisfield to the north-west. The nearest government secondary school is Ayr State High School in Ayr to the north-west.

== Facilities ==
Rita Island SES Facility is at 3 Jones Road (19.6297°S 147.5044°E).

Hell Hole Landing boat ramp is at Hodder Road (19.6220°S 147.5656°E). It is managed by the Burdekin Shire Council.
