= Upstart Bay =

Bay in Queensland, Australia

Coordinates: 19.751°S 147.691°E

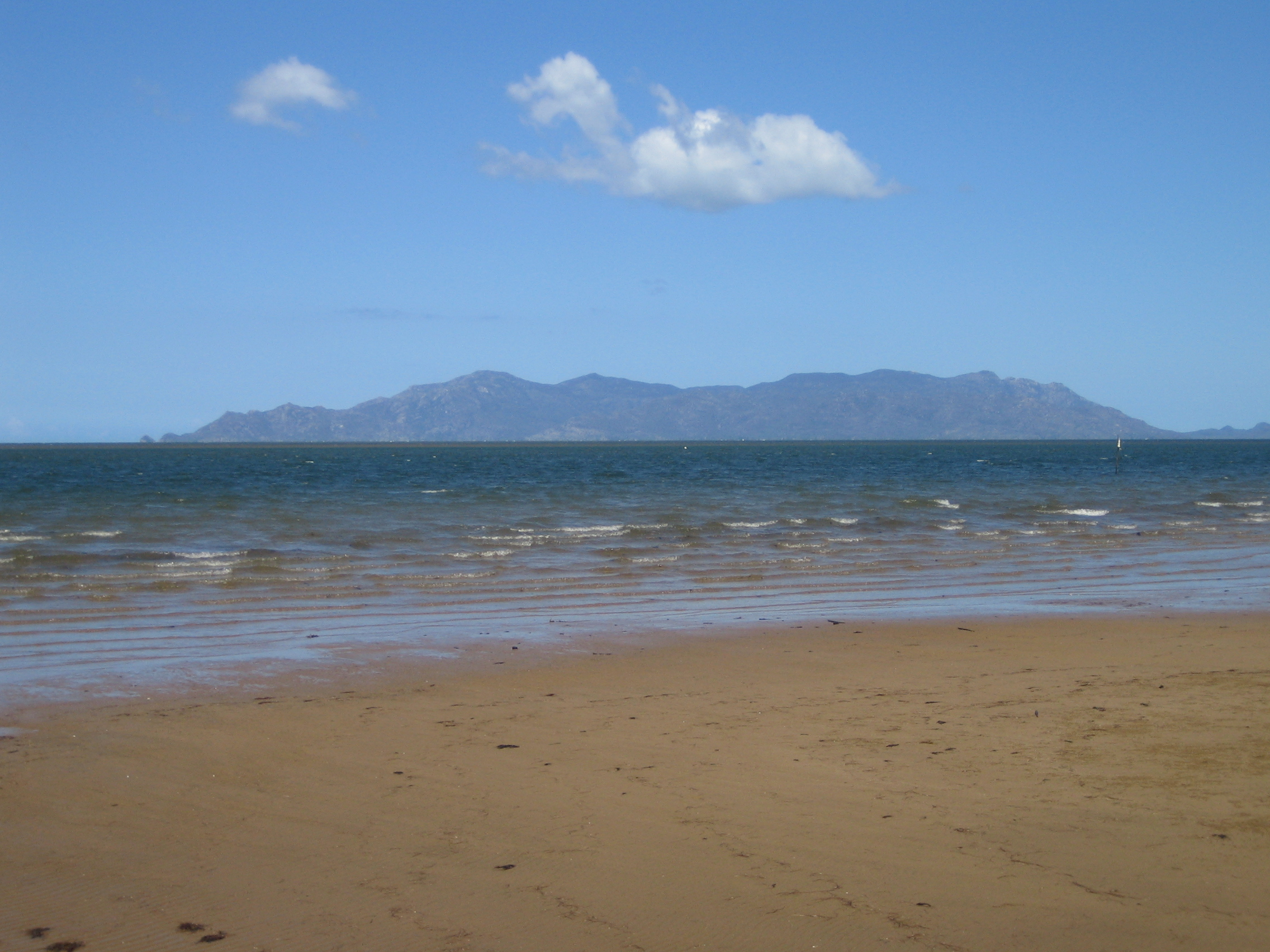
Upstart Bay (foreground) with Cape Upstart (background), 2006

Upstart Bay is a bay in the Burdekin Shire, Queensland, Australia. It is part of the Coral Sea and is the mouth of the Burdekin River.

== History ==
Yuru (also known as Juru, Euronbba, Juru, Mal Mal, Malmal) is an Australian Aboriginal language spoken on Yuru country. The Yuru language region includes the landscape within the local government boundaries of the Shire of Burdekin, including the town of Home Hill.

The bay takes its name from Cape Upstart which was named by Lieutenant James Cook on 5 June 1770 during his voyage along the eastern coast of Australia in the HM Bark Endeavour.
