= Tolga, Queensland =

Tolga
- Town
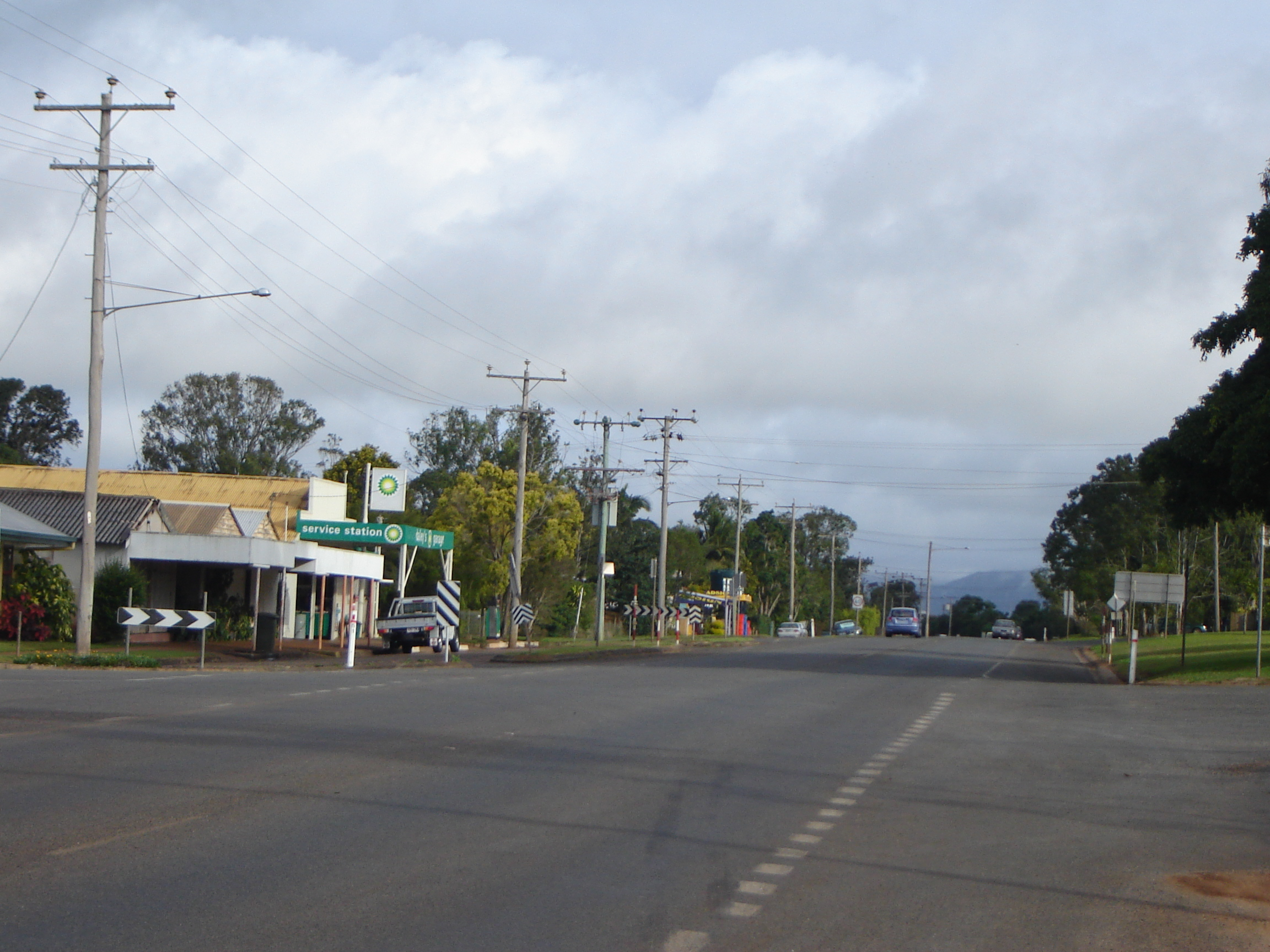
- Kennedy Highway near the intersection with Main Street, Tolga

- Interactive map of Tolga
- Coordinates: 17.2230°S 145.4788°E
- Country: Australia
- State: Queensland
- LGA: Tablelands Region
- Location: 7.1 km (4.4 mi) N of Atherton; 89 km (55 mi) SW of Cairns; 1,691 km (1,051 mi) NNW of Brisbane
- Established: 1885

Government
  - State electorate: Hill
  - Federal division: Kennedy

Area
  - Total: 85.3 km^{2} (32.9 sq mi)
- Elevation: 760 m (2,490 ft)

Population
  - Total: 3,177 (2021 census)
  - Density: 37.245/km^{2} (96.46/sq mi)
- Time zone: UTC+10:00 (AEST)
- Postcode: 4882
- Mean max temp: 25.6 °C (78.1 °F)
- Mean min temp: 15.3 °C (59.5 °F)
- Annual rainfall: 1,400 mm (55 in)
Localities around Tolga
Walkamin	Mareeba	Tinaroo
Arriga	Tolga	Kairi
Mutchilba	Watsonville	Atherton

Tolga is a rural town and locality in the Tablelands Region, Queensland, Australia. It is the centre of the region's peanut industry and is home to the Big Peanut (17.2032°S 145.4760°E). In the 2021 census, the locality of Tolga had a population of 3,177 people.

== Geography ==
Tolga is located on the Atherton Tableland. The Kennedy Highway traverses the locality from the north-west to the south of the locality, passing through the town which is in the southern part of the locality. To the north-west of the town is a large residential development which is marketed under the names of Tandara, Rangeview and Panorama Views.

Mapee is a neighbourhood within the centre of the locality (17.1901°S 145.4677°E). Yadjin is a neighbourhood in the south-east of the locality (17.2166°S 145.5°E).

The Barron River forms the north-east boundary of the locality. The south-western boundary of the locality is the Great Dividing Range which creates the drainage divide that separates the drainage basin of the Barron River (which flows to the Coral Sea) from that of the Mitchell River (which flows to the Gulf of Carpentaria).

The northern and eastern parts of Tolga are relatively flat land used for growing crops. The western parts are more mountainous (creating the drainage divide) and are mostly undeveloped. Bones Knob is a peak to the west of the town (17.2166°S 145.4441°E) at 962 metres (3,156 ft) above sea level.

The Tolga Scrub on the southern side of town (within the locality of Atherton, 17.2367°S 145.4794°E) is one of the last remaining areas of Mabi rainforest on the Atherton Tableland. It is the most drought resistant type of rainforest in Australia. The Tolga Scrub is 2 kilometres (1.2 mi) long and 100 metres wide.

== History ==
Bones Knob is thought to be named after a young Aboriginal man known as "Bones", mention in a letter written in February 1879 by Alexander Douglas of the Native Mounted Police to Inspector Stuart of the Queensland Police.

The town was originally called Martin Town after sawmillers George and Robert Martin, and grew out of a Cobb and Co staging post at Rocky Creek.

Martintown Provisional School opened on 10 October 1895. It was renamed Tolga Provisional School in 1905. On 1 January 1909, it became Tolga State School. The school celebrated its centenary in 1995.

The town's name was changed to Tolga in 1903 when Tablelands railway line was extended from Mareeba to Atherton and the local railway station was to be called Tolga, a name thought to be derived from the Aboriginal word for either place where the scrub begins or red volcanic soil. The line opened on 10 August 1903. A branch line from Tolga to Yungaburra was built, opening on 15 March 1910, which was subsequently extended in stages to Millaa Millaa by 19 December 1921. The line between Atherton and Mareeba became non-operational on 1 July 2011 and was officially closed on 15 March 2013. Tolga railway station was between the Kennedy Highway and Lawson Street (17.2208°S 145.4797°E).

Mapee takes its name from its railway station, assigned by the Queensland Railways Department on 11 January 1915. It is an Aboriginal word meaning tree kangaroo.

Yadjin takes its name from its railway station name, assigned by the Queensland Railways Department on 26 June 1922, an Aboriginal word meaning grass pocket.

During World War II in 1943 the Australian Army established their largest storage and repair centre to the west of the town centred on Griffin Road and Tate Road to support the War in the Pacific. It was known as the 13 Australian Advanced Ordnance Depot and was operated by the Royal Australian Army Ordnance Corps under the command of lieutenant colonel LW Gale with a staff of about 1000 including 200 from the Australian Women's Army Service. The complex had about 150 buildings, including 18 large igloo storage shed. The complex stored, repaired and maintained Army vehicles and vehicle parts, weapons and ammunition, and clothing.

Most buildings on the site were removed in 1946 after the war had ended with one building being relocated to the Atherton Hospital for the use of the Queensland Country Women's Association. On Friday 29 November 1946, three Army personnel were working to remove cordite from the shells in the ammunition dump when the cordite ignited in a blinding flash. The three men were severely burned in the explosion but managed to crawl over a mile to their headquarters. Although they were rushed to the Atheron hospital, the three men died and were buried at the Atherton War Cemetery.

== Demographics ==
In the 2006 census, the town of Tolga had a population of 843 people.

In the 2011 census, the locality of Tolga had a population of 2,426 people.

In the 2016 census, the locality of Tolga had a population of 2,718 people.

In the 2021 census, the locality of Tolga had a population of 3,177 people.

== Heritage listings ==
Tolga has a number of heritage-listed sites, including:

- Bones Knob Radar Station, Bowcock Road
- Rocky Creek World War Two Hospital Complex, Kennedy Highway

== Education ==
Tolga State School is a government primary (Prep–6) school for boys and girls at Main Street (17.2232°S 145.4775°E). In 2018, the school had an enrolment of 328 students with 24 teachers (20 full-time equivalent) and 17 non-teaching staff (10 full-time equivalent). In 2023, the school had an enrolment of 316 students with 24 teachers (21 full-time equivalent) and 15 non-teaching staff (11 full-time equivalent).

There is no government secondary school in Tolga. The nearest government secondary school is Atherton State High School in neighbouring Atherton to the south.

There are also non-government schools in Atherton.

== Community groups ==
The Tolga branch of the Queensland Country Women's Association meets at the QCWA Hall at 60 Main Street (17.22288°S 145.47920°E).
