= Bindal people =

Indigenous Australian people of Queensland

Juru/Yuru people
- Aka: Bendalgubber
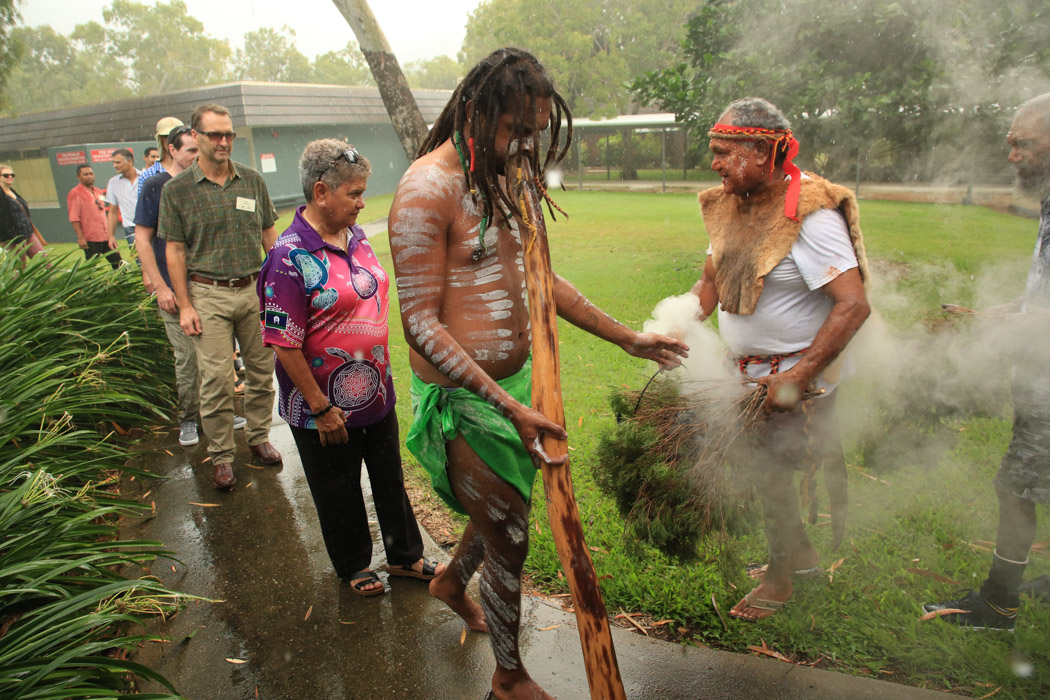
- Smoking ceremony led by Bindal elders at Australian Institute of Marine Science, Cape Cleveland, 21 March 2018

Hierarchy
- Language family: Pama–Nyungan
- Language branch: Nyawaygic
- Language group: Bindal
- Group dialects: Lower Burdekin

Area (approx. 2 600 km^{2})
- BioRegion: NQ Dry Tropics
- Location: North Queensland
- Coordinates: 19°35′S 147°15′E
- Mountains: Mount Elliot
- Rivers: Burdekin River Haughton River
- Other geological: Bowling Green wetlands
- Urban areas: Ayr

The Bindal (aka Bendalgubber) are the Aboriginal Australian people whose ancestors originally possessed, occupied, used and enjoyed approximately 2600 km^{2} of coastal country from the mouth of the Burdekin River north to Cape Cleveland, inland to Leichhardt Range, in the state of Queensland

== Country ==
The Bindal people's coastal country includes the Burdekin River's outlet in the south, running northwards as far as Cape Cleveland and inland to the Leichhardt Range. They were the indigenous people of Ayr. Norman Tindale estimated the overall extent of their lands at about 1,000 square miles (2,600 km^{2}).

== Language ==
Bindal is an extinct Australian Aboriginal language of the Pama–Nyungan language family. Bowern suggests that it might have been a Maric language. Gavan Breen has classified it as one of the Lower Burdekin languages yet presumes that one of two Lower Burdekin languages, which he concluded were not Maric, is Bindal. Only some confused word lists survive bearing on Bindal.

== Alternative names ==
- Bendalgubber
- North Murri

== Sources ==
- Bowern, Claire (2011). "How Many Languages Were Spoken in Australia?". Anggarrgoon: Australian languages on the web.(corrected 6 February 2012)
- "E61 Bindal". Australian Institute of Aboriginal and Torres Strait Islander Studies. 26 July 2019.
- Dortens, Emma (2018). The Lives of Stories: Three Aboriginal-Settler Friendships (PDF). Australian National University Press. ISBN 978-1-760-46240-6.
- Morrill, James (1866) [1863]. Gregory, Edmund (ed.). Sketch of a residence among the Aboriginals of Northern Queensland for seventeen years. Brisbane: Courier Printing Office.
- Morrill, James (1896). Gregory, Edmund (ed.). Narrative of James Murrells' ('Jemmy Morrill') seventeen years' exile among the wild blacks of North Queensland : and his life and shipwreck and terrible adventures among savage tribes; their manners, customs, languages, and superstitions. Also Murrells' Rescue and return to Civilization. Brisbane: Edmund Gregory.
- This Wikipedia article incorporates text from Bindal published by the State Library of Queensland under CC BY licence, accessed on 17 May 2022.
- Gregory, Edmund (1886). "Mount Elliott" (PDF). In Curr, Edward Micklethwaite (ed.). The Australian race: its origin, languages, customs, place of landing in Australia and the routes by which it spread itself over the continent. Vol. 2. Melbourne: J. Ferres. pp. 448–453 – via Internet Archive.
- O'Conner, J. (1886). "Mouths of the Burdekin River" (PDF). In Curr, Edward Micklethwaite (ed.). The Australian race: its origin, languages, customs, place of landing in Australia and the routes by which it spread itself over the continent. Vol. 2. Melbourne: J. Ferres. pp. 454–455 – via Internet Archive.
- Scott, J.Hall (1886). "Burdekin River, various tribes" (PDF). In Curr, Edward Micklethwaite (ed.). The Australian race: its origin, languages, customs, place of landing in Australia and the routes by which it spread itself over the continent. Vol. 2. Melbourne: J. Ferres. pp. 492–501 – via Internet Archive.
- Tindale, Norman Barnett (1974). "Bindal (QLD)". Aboriginal Tribes of Australia: Their Terrain, Environmental Controls, Distribution, Limits, and Proper Names. Australian National University Press.
