= Cromarty, Queensland =

Cromarty
- Suburb
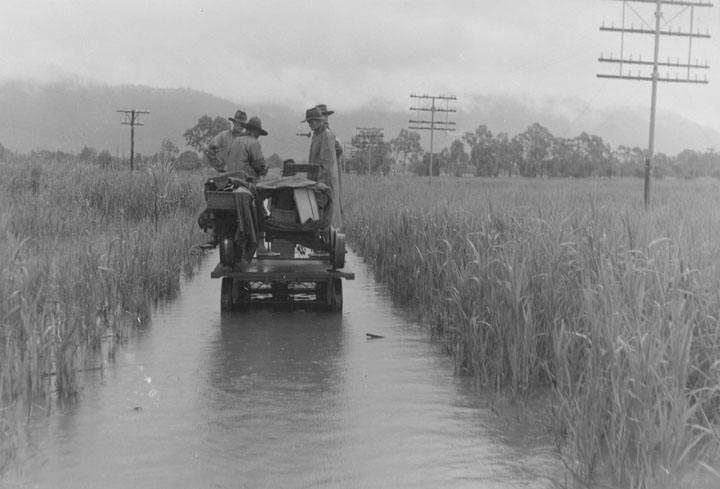
- Flood waters near Cromarty showing a gang trolley advancing through water, circa 1930

- Interactive map of Cromarty
- Coordinates: 19.4672°S 147.0644°E
- Country: Australia
- State: Queensland
- LGA: Shire of Burdekin
- Location: 42.3 km (26.3 mi) SE of Townsville CBD; 49.9 km (31.0 mi) WNW of Ayr; 1,324 km (823 mi) NNW of Brisbane

Government
  - State electorate: Burdekin
  - Federal division: Dawson

Area
  - Total: 62.1 km^{2} (24.0 sq mi)

Population
  - Total: 43 (2021 census)
  - Density: 0.692/km^{2} (1.793/sq mi)
- Time zone: UTC+10:00 (AEST)
- Postcode: 4809
Suburbs around Cromarty
Mount Elliot	Cape Cleveland	Giru
Mount Elliot	Cromarty	Giru
Mount Elliot	Mount Surround	Giru

Cromarty is a rural locality in the Shire of Burdekin, Queensland, Australia. In the 2021 census, Cromarty had a population of 43 people.

== Geography ==
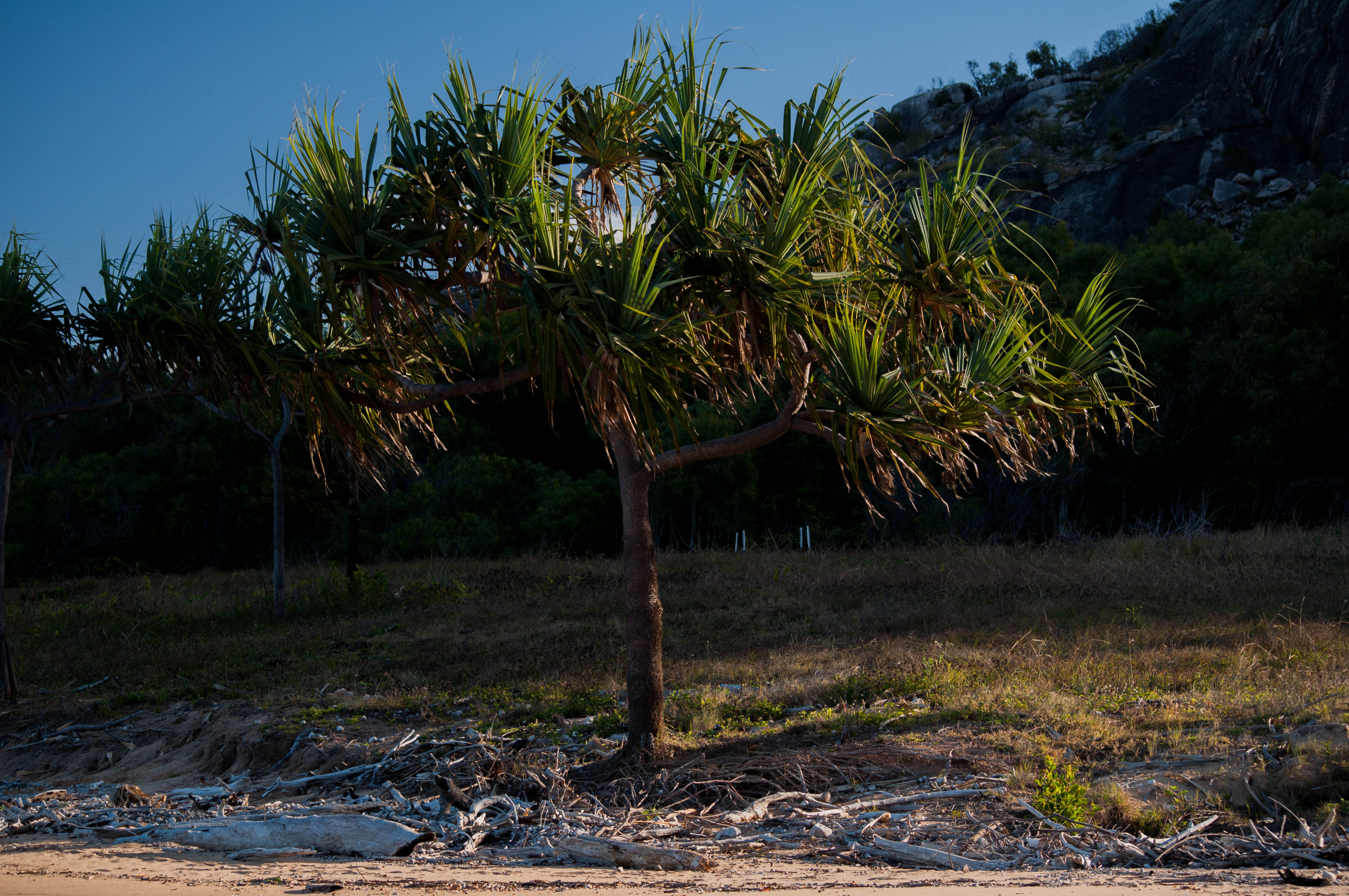
Bowling Green Bay National Park, 2014

The locality is bounded to the east by the meandering Haughton River and to the north by Burrumbush Creek, a tributary of the Haughton River. Their confluence is at the north-eastern corner of the locality.

Most of the locality is protected within the Bowling Green Bay National Park (the north-eastern and eastern part of the locality) and the Wongaloo Conservation Park (the north-western part of the locality). The land use in the remaining south-west of the locality is predominantly grazing on native vegetation.

The Bruce Highway enters the locality from the south (Mount Surround) and exits to the north-west (Mount Elliot / Cape Cleveland).

The North Coast railway line enters the locality from the south-west (Mount Surround / Guru) and exists to the north-west (Mount Elliot / Cape Cleveland). The locality was served by three railway stations, from north to south:

- Storth railway station (19.4126°S 147.0337°E).
- Cromarty railway station (19.4707°S 147.0535°E)
- Piralko railway station, now abandoned (19.4998°S 147.0737°E)

== History ==
The locality was officially named and bounded on 27 July 1991.

== Demographics ==
In the 2016 census, Cromarty had a population of 21 people.

In the 2021 census, Cromarty had a population of 43 people.

== Education ==
There are no schools are Cromarty. The nearest government primary school is Giru State School in neighbouring Giru to the south-east. The nearest government secondary schools are William Ross State High School in Annandale, Townsville to the north-west and Ayr State High School in Ayr to the south-east.
