= Bindal =

Bindal may refer to:

== People ==
- Bindal people, an Indigenous Australian people of the state of North Queensland
- Rajeev Bindal, a former minister of health and family welfare in Himachal Pradesh, India
- Rajesh Bindal, an Indian judge

== Places ==
- Bindal Municipality, a municipality in Nordland county, Norway
- Bindal River, a river in Uttarakhand, India

== Other ==
- Bindal language, an extinct Australian Aboriginal language of North Queensland
- Euastacus bindal, a species of southern crawfish in the family Parastacidae
