= Majors Creek, Queensland =

Majors Creek
- Suburb
- Interactive map of Majors Creek
- Coordinates: 19.6360°S 147.0069°E
- Country: Australia
- State: Queensland
- LGAs: City of Townsville; Shire of Burdekin
- Location: 51.2 km (31.8 mi) SSE of Annandale; 56.6 km (35.2 mi) SSE of Townsville CBD; 58.1 km (36.1 mi) W of Ayr; 66.6 km (41.4 mi) W of Home Hill; 1,323 km (822 mi) NNW of Brisbane

Government
  - State electorate: Burdekin
  - Federal divisions: Kennedy; Dawson

Area
  - Total: 198 km^{2} (76 sq mi)

Population
  - Total: 327 (2021 census)
  - Density: 1.652/km^{2} (4.277/sq mi)
- Time zone: UTC+10:00 (AEST)
- Postcode: 4816
Suburbs around Majors Creek
Barringha	Mount Elliot; Mount Surround	Shirbourne
Woodstock	Majors Creek	Horseshoe Lagoon
Woodstock	Upper Haughton	Upper Haughton

Majors Creek is a rural locality split between the City of Townsville and the Shire of Burdekin, Queensland, Australia. In the 2021 census, Majors Creek had a population of 327 people.

== Geography ==
The locality lies on the plain to the south of Mount Elliot. It is bounded by Haughton River to the east, Major Creek to the south and an unnamed creek to the west.

Most of the locality is at elevations of 30 to 50 metres (98 to 164 ft) above sea level, but there are some hills including:

- Major Creek Mountain in the east of the locality (19.6317°S 147.0913°E) at 295 metres (968 ft)
- Artillery Hill in the centre of the locality (19.6410°S 147.0192°E) at 215 metres (705 ft)
- South Double in the centre of the locality (19.6494°S 146.9854°E) at 140 metres (460 ft)

== History ==
Major's Creek State School opened on 9 February 1934. It was mothballed on 31 December 2008 when enrolments were under 10 students. It closed on 31 December 2009. In 2012, when the school's land and buildings were to sold, a reunion was held at the school to dig up the time capsule buried in 1984 to celebrate the school's 50th anniversary. The school was at 54 Majors Creek Road (19.5985°S 146.9015°E). It sold in May 2012 for $264,000.

== Demographics ==
In the 2016 census, Majors Creek had a population of 329 people.

In the 2021 census, Majors Creek had a population of 327 people.

== Economy ==
Majors Creek Homestead is in the east of the locality (19.6476°S 147.0908°E).

== Education ==
There are no schools in Majors Creek. The nearest government primary schools are Woodstock State School in neighbouring Woodstock to the west, Giru State School in Giru to the north-east and Clare State School in Clare to the south-east. The nearest government secondary schools are William Ross State High School in Annandale in Townsville to the north-west, Ayr State High School in Ayr to the north-east, and Home Hill State High School in Home Hill to the east.
