= LJX =

LJX or ljx may refer to:

- Lyndon John X, Canadian reggae and ska musician
- ljx, the ISO 639-3 code for Yuru language, Queensland, Australia
