= Mount Elliot, Queensland =

Mount Elliot
- Suburb
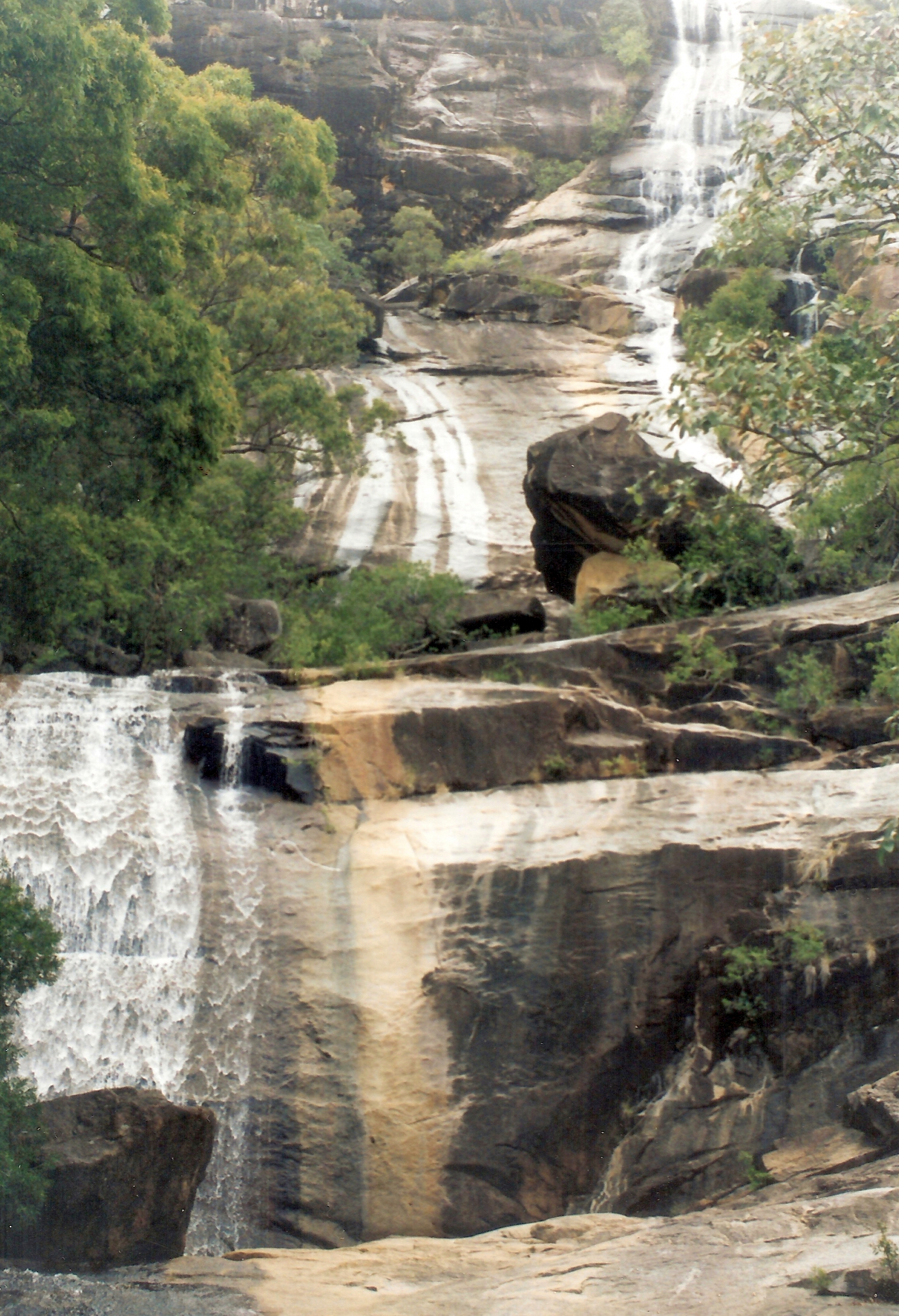
- Alligator Creek Falls, 1997

- Interactive map of Mount Elliot
- Coordinates: 19.5069°S 146.9588°E
- Country: Australia
- State: Queensland
- LGA: City of Townsville
- Location: 26.6 km (16.5 mi) SE of Annandale; 30.0 km (18.6 mi) SE of Townsville CBD; 1,345 km (836 mi) NNW of Brisbane

Government
  - State electorate: Burdekin
  - Federal divisions: Kennedy; Dawson

Area
  - Total: 265.8 km^{2} (102.6 sq mi)

Population
  - Total: 0 (2021 census)
  - Density: 0.0000/km^{2} (0.000/sq mi)
- Time zone: UTC+10:00 (AEST)
- Postcode: 4816
Suburbs around Mount Elliot
| Alligator Creek | Nome | Cape Cleveland |
| Brookhill; Toonpan | Mount Elliot | Cromarty |
| Barringha | Majors Creek | Mount Surround |

Mount Elliot is a rural locality in the City of Townsville, Queensland, Australia. It contains the mountain of the same name. In the 2021 census, Mount Elliot had "no people or a very low population".

== Geography ==
The Bruce Highway and the North Coast railway line form the northern boundary of the locality, with the locality once served by the now-abandoned Clevedon railway station (19.3964°S 147.0220°E). The northern part of Mount Elliot is still known as Clevedon.

The locality has the following named peaks (from north to south):

- Mount Storth (19.4136°S 147.0115°E) 632 metres (2,073 ft)
- Saddle Mountain (19.4460°S 147.0152°E) 882 metres (2,894 ft)
- Mount Elliot (19.4883°S 146.9675°E) 1,218 metres (3,996 ft)
- Shoulder (19.5291°S 146.9960°E) 1,022 metres (3,353 ft)
- Sharp Elliot (19.5550°S 146.9862°E) 1,183 metres (3,881 ft)

The locality is considerably more mountainous than its surrounding localities at 50–100 metres above sea level. The entire locality forms part of the Bowling Green Bay National Park with the Alligator Creek and its waterfall being within the Mount Elliot part of the park.

Mount Elliot is a watershed with the northern and western parts of the mountain draining into the Ross River which enters the Coral Sea at Townsville City and the southern and eastern parts of the mountain draining into the Haughton River which enters the Coral Sea near Giru.

== History ==
The mountain was most likely named by Thomas Stewart, captain of the merchant ship, Lady Elliot, which sailed from Calcutta to Sydney in 1815–1816. It is believed the ship was named after the wife of Hugh Elliot, Privy Counsellor, and Governor of Madras from 1814 to 1820.

From 1846 until 1863, shipwreck survivor James Morrill lived with the Aboriginal clan whose country was Mount Elliot and the surrounding area.

== Demographics ==
In the 2016 census, Mount Elliot had a population of 8 people.

In the 2021 census, Mount Elliot had "no people or a very low population".
