= Shirbourne, Queensland =

Shirbourne
- Suburb
- Interactive map of Shirbourne
- Coordinates: 19.5662°S 147.0760°E
- Country: Australia
- State: Queensland
- LGA: Shire of Burdekin
- Location: 37.8 km (23.5 mi) W of Ayr; 53.9 km (33.5 mi) SE of Townsville CBD; 1,309 km (813 mi) NNW of Brisbane

Government
  - State electorate: Burdekin
  - Federal division: Dawson

Area
  - Total: 34.0 km^{2} (13.1 sq mi)

Population
  - Total: 48 (2021 census)
  - Density: 1.412/km^{2} (3.66/sq mi)
- Time zone: UTC+10:00 (AEST)
- Postcode: 4809
Suburbs around Shirbourne
Mount Surround	Mount Surround	Giru
Mount Surround	Shirbourne	Horseshoe Lagoon
Majors Creek	Majors Creek	Majors Creek

Shirbourne is a rural locality in the Shire of Burdekin, Queensland, Australia. In the 2021 census, Shirbourne had a population of 48 people.

== Geography ==
The Haughton River forms the eastern boundary of the locality.

Ironbark is a mountain in the south of the locality (19.5882°S 147.0604°E), rising to 256 metres (840 ft) above sea level.

The land use in the west and south of the locality is grazing on native vegetation, while the north and east of the locality is used for crop growing, predominantly sugarcane. There is a cane tramway to transport the harvested sugarcane to the local sugar mill, the Invicta sugar mill in neighbouring Giru.

== History ==
Shirbourne State School opened on 17 August 1931 and closed on 7 August 1970. It was at 628 Shirbourne Road (19.5567°S 147.0853°E).

== Demographics ==
In the 2016 census, Shirbourne had a population of 76 people.

In the 2021 census, Shirbourne had a population of 48 people.

== Education ==
There are no schools in Shirbourne. The nearest government primary school is Giru State School in neighbouring Giru to the north-east. The nearest government secondary school is Ayr State High School in Ayr to the east.
