= Cungulla, Queensland =

Cungulla
- Town
- Interactive map of Cungulla
- Coordinates: 19.3944°S 147.1088°E
- Country: Australia
- State: Queensland
- LGA: City of Townsville
- Location: 46.6 km (29.0 mi) SE of Townsville CBD; 1,315 km (817 mi) NNW of Brisbane

Government
  - State electorate: Burdekin
  - Federal division: Dawson

Area
  - Total: 1.6 km^{2} (0.62 sq mi)

Population
  - Total: 307 (2021 census)
  - Density: 192/km^{2} (497/sq mi)
- Time zone: UTC+10:00 (AEST)
- Postcode: 4816
Localities around Cungulla
Cape Cleveland	Coral Sea	Coral Sea
Cape Cleveland	Cungulla	Coral Sea
Cape Cleveland	Cape Cleveland	Cape Cleveland

Cungulla is a coastal town and a locality in the City of Townsville, Queensland, Australia. In the 2021 census, the locality of Cungulla had a population of 307 people.

== History ==
Cungulla is recorded as an Aboriginal word from the Burdekin River area, possibly meaning holiday. It was approved as the town name by Surveyor-General of Queensland on 6 September 1956.

== Demographics ==
In the 2016 census, the locality of Cungulla had a population of 286 people.

In the 2021 census, the locality of Cungulla had a population of 307 people.

== Education ==
There are no schools in Cungulla. The nearest government primary school is Giru State School in Giru to the south. The nearest government secondary school is William Ross State High School in Annandale, Townsville, to the north-west.
