= Alone Australia =

Australian survival reality television competition series

- Genre: Reality; Survival
- Based on: Alone
- Country of origin: Australia
- Original language: English
- No. of seasons: 4
- No. of episodes: 36

Production
- Executive producer: Riima Daher
- Running time: 60 minutes (including ads)
- Production company: ITV Studios Australia

Original release
- Network: SBS
- Release: 29 March 2023 – present

Alone Australia is an Australian survival reality television competition series on SBS which premiered on 29 March 2023. It follows the self-documented daily struggles of 10 individuals as they survive alone in the wilderness for as long as possible using a limited amount of survival equipment. The participants are isolated from each other and all other humans, with the participants having to self-document and film their experiences themselves. They may "tap out" at any time or be removed due to failing a medical check-in. The contestant who remains the longest wins a grand prize of $250,000.

In early 2022, an Australian version was announced by SBS following the success of the American version on the network and its streaming counterpart SBS On Demand. The series is produced by ITV Studios Australia, with the first season taking place around a remote lake in Tasmania's West Coast during winter 2022. The American version of the show also airs on Pay-TV channel A&E via Foxtel. An Alone pop-up channel began broadcasting on Foxtel on 24 February 2023 and ceased broadcasting on 20 March 2023.

The first season was won by Gina Chick after surviving 67 days alone, making her only the second female and oldest contestant in the history of the Alone worldwide to win. The second season was won by Krzysztof Wojtkowski, surviving 64 days alone without eating meat. In June 2023, the series was nominated for the Logie Award for Most Outstanding Factual or Documentary Program, but it lost to The Australian Wars.

Season 4 of the series was filmed in Sápmi, within the Arctic Circle in the far north of Finland and is set to air on 15 July 2026.

== Format ==
Contestants are dropped off in a remote wilderness area, far enough apart to ensure that they will not come in contact with one another. The contest typically begins in mid-to-late autumn; this adds time pressure to the survival experience as the approaching winter causes temperatures to drop and food to become scarce. Although terrains may differ in each contestant's location, the drop-off zones are assessed in advance to ensure a similar distribution of local resources is available to each contestant.

Contestants each select 10 items of survival gear from a pre-approved list of 40, and are issued a kit of standard equipment, clothing and first aid/emergency supplies. They are also given a set of cameras to document their daily experiences. Attempting to live off the land for as long as possible, the contestants must find food, build shelter in order to survive while enduring deep isolation, physical deprivation and psychological stress of being alone.

Contestants who wish to withdraw from the competition for any reason (referred to as "tapping out") may signal a rescue crew using a provided satellite telephone. In addition, medical professionals conduct periodic health checks on the contestants and may, at their discretion, disqualify and evacuate anyone they feel is unable to continue participating safely. The last remaining contestant wins a $250,000 cash prize.

== Episodes and results ==
| Series | Location | Episodes | Originally released | | Days Lasted | Winner | Runner-up |
| Series | Location | Episodes | First released | Last released | Days Lasted | Winner | Runner-up |
|---|---|---|---|---|---|---|---|
| 1 | South West Tasmania, Australia | 12 | 29 March 2023 | 25 May 2023 | 67 | Gina Chick | Mike Atkinson |
| 2 | Fiordland, New Zealand | 11 | 27 March 2024 | 29 May 2024 | 64 | Krzysztof Wojtkowski | Suzan Muir |
| 3 | West Coast Range, Tasmania, Australia | 13 | 26 March 2025 | 11 June 2025 | 76 | Shay Williamson | Murray "Muzza" James |
| 4 | Sápmi, Finland | TBA | 15 July 2026 | TBA | TBA | Trent Fenton | TBA |

=== Season 1 (2023) ===
==== Episodes ====
| No. overall | No. in season | Title | Original release date | Aus. viewers |
|---|---|---|---|---|
| 1 | 1 | "The Drop" | 29 March 2023 | 212,000 (Note: Figure averaged across both premiere episodes) |
"Travellers, there is no path. Paths are made by walking." - Antonio Machado
| 2 | 2 | "Fired Up" | 29 March 2023 | 212,000 |
"There's no harm in hoping for the best as long as you're prepared for the worst." - Stephen King
| 3 | 3 | "Unforced Error" | 5 April 2023 | 193,000 |
"Hunger is the handmaid of genius" - Mark Twain
| 4 | 4 | "Head Games" | 12 April 2023 | N/A |
"The world breaks everyone and afterward many are strong at the broken places." - Ernest Hemingway
| 5 | 5 | "Spent" | 19 April 2023 | 233,000 |
"He who has a why to live can bear almost any how" - Friedrich Nietzsche
| 6 | 6 | "Sink or Swim" | 26 April 2023 | 231,000 |
"The important thing in life is not the triumph but the struggle." - Pierre de Coubertin
| 7 | 7 | "Trapped" | 3 May 2023 | 230,000 |
"There's something to be said for hunger: at least it lets you know you're still alive" - Margaret Atwood
| 8 | 8 | "Severed" | 10 May 2023 | 229,000 |
"Solitude, isolation, are painful things, and beyond human endurance" - Jules Verne
| 9 | 9 | "Making Moves" | 17 May 2023 | 203,000 |
"Our greatest weakness lies in giving up. The most certain way to succeed is always to try just one more time." - Thomas Edison
| 10 | 10 | "The Dark of Night" | 24 May 2023 | 245,000 (Note: Figure averaged across both finale episodes) |
"Only those who risk going too far can possibly find out how far they can go" - T. S. Eliot
| 11 | 11 | "The Storm" | 24 May 2023 | 245,000 |
"By endurance we conquer" - Ernest Shackleton
| 12 | 12 | "The Reunion" | 25 May 2023 (Note: The Reunion was made available to stream on 24 May 2023 on SBS On Demand immediately after the broadcast of the final two episodes on SBS. The reunion was broadcast the following day on SBS) | 123,000 |
Hosted by Amanda Keller, the ten contestants meet to discuss their Alone experience.

==== Results ====
| Name | Age | Hometown | Occupation | Reason(s) for leaving | Day | Outcome |
|---|---|---|---|---|---|---|
| Gina Chick | 52 | NSW | Rewilding Facilitator | - | 67 days | Winner |
| Mike Atkinson | 45 | NSW | Solo Adventurist | Medically evacuated - low blood pressure and malnutrition | 64 days | Runner-up |
| Michael Wallace | 43 | NSW | Vet and Bush Regenerator | Missed family | 32 days | 3rd place |
| Kate Grarock | 41 | ACT | Wildlife Biologist | Missed family | 22 days | 4th place |
| Chris Bakon | 39 | TAS | Army Veteran | Wanted to leave on a high after experiencing post-traumatic stress disorder | 12 days | 5th place |
| Duane Byrnes | 35 | NSW | Wildlife and Environmental Officer | Struggled with isolation | 10 days | 6th place |
| Peter Athanassiou | 31 | NSW | Hunting Guide | Struggled to find food; fell and injured knee | 3 days | 7th place |
| Jimmy Lassaline | 22 | SA | Farmhand and Engineering Student | Medically evacuated - developed COVID-19, which caused his heart to beat at twice the usual rate | 2 days | 8th place |
| Beck Henog | 42 | VIC | School Teacher | Missed family; could not start a fire due to wet materials | 2 days | 9th place |
| Rob Kelly | 41 | VIC | Planning and Environmental Manager | Missed family | 2 days | 10th place |

=== Season 2 (2024) ===
==== Episodes ====
| No. overall | No. in season | Title | Original release date | Aus. viewers |
|---|---|---|---|---|
| 13 | 1 | "Episode 1" | 27 March 2024 | 262,000 |
"Beauty is terror. Whatever we call beautiful, we quiver before it" - Donna Tartt
| 14 | 2 | "Episode 2" | 3 April 2024 | 287,000 |
"The most important factor in survival is neither intelligence nor strength but adaptability" - Charles Darwin
| 15 | 3 | "Episode 3" | 10 April 2024 | 314,000 |
"Necessity is the mother of invention" - Richard Franck
| 16 | 4 | "Episode 4" | 17 April 2024 | 305,000 |
"Life is a circle. The end of one journey is the beginning of the next" - Joseph M. Marshall III
| 17 | 5 | "Episode 5" | 24 April 2024 | 253,000 |
"When you come to the end of your rope, tie a knot and hang on" - Franklin D. Roosevelt
| 18 | 6 | "Episode 6" | 1 May 2024 | 264,000 |
"Anywhere the struggle is great, the level of ingenuity and inventiveness is high" - Eleni Zaude Gabre-Madhin
| 19 | 7 | "Episode 7" | 8 May 2024 | 298,000 |
"The triumph can't be had without the struggle" - Wilma Rudolph
| 20 | 8 | "Episode 8" | 15 May 2024 | 304,000 |
"Hunger is a powerful reorganiser of the conscience" - Margaret Atwood
| 21 | 9 | "Episode 9" | 22 May 2024 | 276,000 |
"Now is the winter of our discontent" - William Shakespeare
| 22 | 10 | "Episode 10" | 29 May 2024 | 345,000 |
"As man disappears from sight, the land remains." - Māori Proverb
| 23 | 11 | "Reunion Special" | 29 May 2024 | 214,000 |
Hosted by Hamish Blake, the ten contestants meet to discuss their Alone experience.

==== Results ====
Notable among the Season 2 contestants was Leanne, the wife of Season 1 contestant Rob Kelly.

| Name | Age | Hometown | Occupation | Reason(s) for leaving | Day | Outcome |
|---|---|---|---|---|---|---|
| Krzysztof Wojtkowski | 39 | Ferny Creek, VIC | Aquaculturalist | - | 64 days | Winner |
| Suzan Muir | 54 | Cavendish, VIC | Wilderness Adventure Guide | Heart issues (Shared on Reunion) | 63 days | Runner-up |
| Andreas Lundin | 42 | Sydney, NSW | Personal Trainer and Subsistence Hunter | Lost 30% body weight, not willing to risk health and sanity | 57 days | 3rd place |
| Tamika Simpson | 51 | Pomona, QLD | Off-Gridder and Former Police Officer | Did not want to kill animals for food | 53 days | 4th place |
| Rick J. Petersen | 58 | Sunshine Coast, QLD | Survival Educator and Former SAS Soldier | Missed family | 38 days | 5th place |
| Jack | 55 | NSW | Tradesman and Wild Game Hunter | Lack of food | 16 days | 6th place |
| Chace Leitch | 27 | Brisbane, QLD | Defence Force Combat Engineer | Missed family, wife pregnant | 10 days | 7th place |
| Jason Allwood | 36 | Tamworth, NSW | Youth Worker and Jungai | Mental health concerns, lack of food | 8 days | 8th place |
| Leanne Mitchell | 41 | Mildura, VIC | World Heritage Aboriginal Programs Officer | Missed family | 4 days | 9th place |
| Mike Hayes | 60 | Barrengarry, NSW | Resilience Coach | Medically evacuated - chest pain | 2 days | 10th place |

=== Season 3 (2025) ===
==== Episodes ====
| No. overall | No. in season | Title | Original release date | Aus. viewers |
|---|---|---|---|---|
| 24 | 1 | "Episode 1" | 26 March 2025 | 214,000 |
"Tell me, what is it you plan to do with your one wild and precious life?" - Mary Oliver
| 25 | 2 | "Episode 2" | 26 March 2025 | 214,000 |
"We will either find a way or make one" - Hannibal
| 26 | 3 | "Episode 3" | 2 April 2025 | 258,000 |
"We are the sum total of our hungers" - A. W. Tozer
| 27 | 4 | "Episode 4" | 9 April 2025 | 244,000 |
"And into the forest I go, to lose my mind and find my soul" - John Muir
| 28 | 5 | "Episode 5" | 16 April 2025 | 247,000 |
"We mortals, men and women, devour many a disappointment between breakfast and dinner-time" - George Eliot
| 29 | 6 | "Episode 6" | 23 April 2025 | 261,000 |
"The most effective way to do it, is to do it" - Amelia Earhart
| 30 | 7 | "Episode 7" | 30 April 2025 | 266,000 |
"The mind is its own place, and in itself can make a Heaven of Hell, a Hell of Heaven." - John Milton
| 31 | 8 | "Episode 8" | 7 May 2025 | 281,000 |
"To be alive is to be vulnerable" - Madeleine L'Engle
| 32 | 9 | "Episode 9" | 14 May 2025 | 304,000 |
"You cannot run away from weakness; you must some time fight it out or perish" - Robert Louis Stevenson
| 33 | 10 | "Episode 10" | 21 May 2025 | 311,000 |
"On a long enough timeline, the survival rate for everyone drops to zero" - Chuck Palahniuk
| 34 | 11 | "Episode 11" | 4 June 2025 | 342,000 |
"We say the earth is our mother - we cannot own her, she owns us." - Oodgeroo Noonuccal & Kabul Oodgeroo Noonuccal
| 35 | 12 | "Episode 12" | 4 June 2025 | 342,000 |
"It's good to have an end to journey towards; but it is the journey that matters, in the end." - Ursula K Le Guin
| 36 | 13 | "Reunion Special" | 11 June 2025 | N/A |
Hosted by Kumi Taguchi, the ten contestants meet to discuss their Alone experience.

==== Results ====
| Name | Age | Hometown | Occupation | Reason(s) for leaving | Day | Outcome |
|---|---|---|---|---|---|---|
| Shay Williamson | 30 | Whakatāne, NZ | Professional Trapper | - | 76 days | Winner |
| Murray "Muzza" James | 63 | Bendigo, VIC | Bushman | Medically evacuated - experienced dizziness and pain | 73 days | Runner-up |
| Corinne Ooms | 38 | Hobart, TAS | Food Safety Consultant | Felt journey was complete, concern about weight loss | 70 days | 3rd place |
| Tom Covell | 33 | Wisemans Ferry, NSW | Ecologist | Lack of food | 47 days | 4th place |
| Ben Grieger | 38 | Loxton, SA | English Teacher | Medically evacuated - low blood pressure; significant weight loss | 40 days | 5th place |
| Karla Pound | 35 | Airlie Beach, QLD | Expedition Leader | Missed family and friends; lack of food | 35 days | 6th place |
| Yonke van Geloven | 52 | Clunes, VIC | Farmer & Permaculturalist | Lack of food and frustration with needing to film | 31 days | 7th place |
| Ceilidh Marigold | 34 | Bundaberg, QLD | Disability Services Officer | Medically evacuated - suspected UTI | 19 days | 8th place |
| Eva Angophora | 31 | Wollombi, NSW | Rewilding Facilitator | Lack of food | 17 days | 9th place |
| Matt Allwood | 31 | Broome, WA | Indigenous Youth Worker | Missed family | 16 days | 10th place |

=== Season 4 (2026) ===
==== Episodes ====
| No. overall | No. in season | Title | Original release date | Aus. viewers |
|---|---|---|---|---|
| 37 | 1 | "Episode 1" | 15 July 2026 | 227,000 |
"Winter is coming." - George R. R. Martin
| 38 | 2 | "Episode 2" | 15 July 2026 | 227,000 |
"The mind... is a landscape in which getting lost is easy and some regions are terrifying to visit." - Rebecca Solnit
| 39 | 3 | "Episode 3" | 22 July 2026 | N/A |
"The question is not what you look at, but what you see." - Henry David Thoreau
| 40 | 4 | "Episode 4" | 29 July 2026 | N/A |
"He who has rowed little has weak arms." - Sámi proverb
| 41 | 5 | "Episode 5" | 5 August 2026 | N/A |
"Nothing like an empty stomach to remind you what you are." - Charles Yu
| 42 | 6 | "Episode 6" | 12 August 2026 | N/A |
"the snow doesn't give a soft white damn Whom it touches" - E. E. Cummings
| 43 | 7 | "Episode 7" | 19 August 2026 | N/A |
"Only those who will risk going too far can possibly find out how far one can go" - T. S. Eliot
| 44 | 8 | "Episode 8" | 26 August 2026 | N/A |
"You mustn't confuse a single failure with a final defeat." - F. Scott Fitzgerald
| 45 | 9 | "Episode 9" | 2 September 2026 | N/A |
"Reality exists in the human mind, and nowhere else." - George Orwell

==== Results ====
| Name | Age | Residence | Occupation | Reason(s) for leaving | Day | Outcome |
|---|---|---|---|---|---|---|
| Clint Waghorn | 57 | NZ | Sheep and Cattle Farmer | Complications from not eating | 47 days | 3rd |
| Jasper Harvey | 24 | Margaret River, WA | Permaculture Practitioner & Educator | medically evacuated - hand infection requiring antibiotics | 48 days | 2nd |
| Trent Fenton | 39 | Hobart, TAS | Ex Navy Chef | Winner | 52 days | 1st |
| Dylan Hyatt-Jacobson | 35 | QLD | Domestic & Family Violence High Risk Team Specialist | Flare up of pre-existing back injury | 42 days | |
| Dougy | 43 | WA | Electrician | Medically evacuated - low blood pressure, dizzy spells | 32 days | |
| Sia Kindberg | 44 | Melbourne, VIC | Design Project Consultant/Ultramarathon Runner | Exacerbating pre-existing frostbite | 28 days | |
| Arash | 32 | QLD | Wrecking Yard Manager | Disqualified for breaching safety guidelines - departed camp without necessary safety equipment | 26 days | |
| Alyce Nehme | 36 | Perth, WA | Aboriginal Community Engagement Senior Advisor | Lack of food | 20 days | |
| Lillian Lingman | 25 | Alice Springs, NT/nomadic | International Outdoor Guide | Mental health concerns | 12 days | |
| Misty Dullahide | 29 | Melbourne, VIC | Adventure Tour Guide | Didn’t want to be alone | 7 days | |

== Reception ==
=== Awards and nominations ===
| Year | Award | Category | Result | Ref. |
|---|---|---|---|---|
| 2023 | Logie Awards | Most Outstanding Factual or Documentary Program | Nominated | |
| 2024 | Logie Awards | Best Competition Reality Program | Nominated | |
| 2025 | Logie Awards | Best Competition Reality Program | Nominated | |
| 2026 | AACTA Awards | Best Factual Entertainment Program | Won | |

=== Critical reception ===
The series received positive reviews in its first season. David Knox of TV Tonight rated the series 4½ out of 5 stating, "Above all, there’s nothing else like this on television and that -alone- makes it worth checking out". Wenlei Ma of News.com.au gave a positive review stating, "That insight into human nature at its limit is the gem in this series."

=== Viewership ===
Although overnight ratings for the first two episodes, played as double episode, averaged 212,000 viewers, total numbers reached 761,000, an increase of 138%, making it one of SBS's most watched series for 2023. The third episode averaged 195,000 viewers overnight, and reached 791,000 in total numbers. The fourth episode averaged 205,000 viewers overnight, and reached 826,000 in total numbers.

== See also ==
- Australian Survivor
- List of Australian television series
- Survivorman
- Wilderness survival
