= Michael Atkinson =

Michael or Mike Atkinson may refer to:

- Michael Atkinson (composer), Australian songwriter and musician since 1975
- Michael Atkinson (politician) (born 1958), South Australian MP
- Michael Atkinson (writer) (born 1962), American poet and film critic
- Michael Atkinson (inspector general) (born 1964), American intelligence community official
- Michael Atkinson (presenter), Australian sports presenter, broadcaster, and journalist
- Michael D. Atkinson, mathematician and computer scientist
- Mike Atkinson (born 1994), English footballer
- Outback Mike (Michael Atkinson), Australian survival expert
