= Mount Surround, Queensland =

Mount Surround
- Suburb
- Interactive map of Mount Surround
- Coordinates: 19.5367°S 147.0458°E
- Country: Australia
- State: Queensland
- LGA: Shire of Burdekin
- Location: 5.6 km (3.5 mi) W of Giru; 39.8 km (24.7 mi) WNW of Ayr; 48.4 km (30.1 mi) SE of Townsville; 1,312 km (815 mi) NNW of Brisbane

Government
  - State electorate: Burdekin
  - Federal division: Dawson

Area
  - Total: 36.3 km^{2} (14.0 sq mi)

Population
  - Total: 130 (2021 census)
  - Density: 3.58/km^{2} (9.3/sq mi)
- Time zone: UTC+10:00 (AEST)
- Postcode: 4809
Suburbs around Mount Surround
Mount Elliot	Cromarty	Giru
Mount Elliot	Mount Surround	Shirbourne
Mount Elliot	Majors Creek	Majors Creek

Mount Surround is a rural locality in the Shire of Burdekin, Queensland, Australia. In the 2021 census, Mount Surround had a population of 130 people.

== Geography ==
The Bruce Highway enters the locality from the south-east (Shirbourne) and exits to the north (Cromarty).

The North Coast railway line forms the north-eastern boundary of the locality, entering from the north-east (Giru) and exiting to the north (Cromarty); no railway stations serve the locality.

The land use is a mixture of crop growing (predominantly sugarcane) and grazing on native vegetation with some rural residential housing.

== History ==
Mount Surround State School opened 1 April 1932 and closed 3 May 1968. It was on the northern corner of Reed Beds Road and Piralko Road (approx 19.51717°S 147.05708°E).

== Demographics ==
In the 2016 census, Mount Surround had a population of 145 people.

In the 2021 census, Mount Surround had a population of 130 people.

== Education ==
There are no schools in Mount Surround. The nearest government primary school is Giru State School in neighbouring Giru to the north-east. The nearest government secondary schools are Ayr State High School in Ayr and William Ross State High School in Annandale, Townsville.
