= Bindal language =

Extinct Indigenous Australian language

Bindal
- Bendalgubba, Nyawaygi
- Native to: Australia
- Region: Queensland
- Ethnicity: Bindal people
- Era: attested 1865
- Language family: Pama–Nyungan: (unclassified, possibly Maric or Lower Burdekin); Bindal

Language codes
- ISO 639-3: xbd
- Glottolog: bind1237 see Lower Burdekin languages
- AIATSIS: E61

Bindal (Bendalgubba, Nyawaygi) is an extinct Australian Aboriginal language of North Queensland. The Bindal language region included the area from Cape Cleveland extending south towards Ayr and the mouth of the Burdekin River, encompassing the landscape within the boundaries of the Townsville City Council and Burdekin Shire Council.

== Classification ==
Bowern suggests that it might have been a Maric language. Breen presumes that one of two Lower Burdekin languages, which he concluded were not Maric, is Bindal.

== Vocabulary ==
Some words from the Bindal language, as spelt and written by Bindal authors include:

- Adha: yes
- Andha: saltwater
- Bagaraga: star
- Barri: stone
- Bugan: grass
- Gadhara: possum
- Gamu: water
- Gunbana: blood

== See also ==
- Bindal people
