= James Morrill (castaway) =

English castaway saved by Indigenous Australians

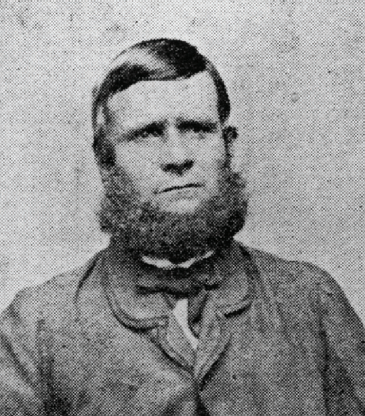
- Born: 1824
- Died: 1865 (aged 40–41)
- Occupation: Sailor

James Morrill (20 May 1824 – 30 October 1865) was an English sailor aboard the vessel Peruvian which became shipwrecked off the coast of north-eastern Australia in 1846. He survived a journey in a makeshift raft to the mainland near the site of the modern city of Townsville and was taken in by a local clan of Aboriginal Australians. He adopted their language and customs and lived as a member of their society for 17 years. By the early 1860s, British colonisation had reached the area and Morrill decided to return to the European way of living. Morrill wrote a memoir of his experiences and died soon after in the town of Bowen in 1865. Morrill is regarded as the first white man to have resided permanently in North Queensland and is one of only a few European people to have lived for an extended period completely within traditional Aboriginal culture.

== Early life ==
Morrill was born in 1824 at Heybridge in the English county Essex. His father was a millwright. He left school at the age of 13 to pursue a career as a sailor, obtaining an apprenticeship in a local shipping company. In 1844, Morrill went to London and was induced to sign up to sail aboard the troopship HMS Ramillies which was bound for Australia carrying soldiers of the Royal Artillery and the 11th and 99th Regiments. In December 1845, HMS Ramillies arrived in Sydney where Morrill obtained permission to leave the ship. He decided to continue an adventurous lifestyle and joined the crew of the vessel Peruvian which was to sail to China.

== Shipwreck of Peruvian ==
In February 1846, Peruvian, commanded by Captain George Pitkethley, departed Sydney with 130 cedar logs for export. On board were 16 officers and crew including Morrill, as well as six passengers including the captain's wife and two other families. Just over a week into the voyage, at around 4:00 a.m., the vessel ran onto a submerged reef near Minerva Shoal in the Coral Sea. The ship was unable to be floated off the rocks and of the two long boats, one was smashed to pieces and the other detached prematurely, floating away with the first mate and a sheep. A raft equipped with a sail was constructed and the remaining 21 people were placed on board with only a few tins of meat and a small keg of water as provisions.

The raft and its occupants set off to reach safety, supplementing their meagre rations with rainwater and fish and bird meat. After about four weeks adrift in the ocean, the castaways started to die. During the following days, legs of the dead were used as bait to catch sharks for consumption by the remaining survivors. Eventually they encountered and sailed through the Great Barrier Reef, and about a week later they made landfall at Cape Cleveland. After 42 days on the raft, only seven people had survived which included Morrill, the captain, the captain's wife, two other crew members, a male passenger and a boy. Despite the survivors being able to construct a camp on the beach and finding water and oysters, the two crew and the passenger soon died.

== Inclusion into Aboriginal society ==
After two weeks onshore, people from the local Cape Cleveland and Mount Elliot Aboriginal clans came to find out who they were. They were given food and water and were assisted in travelling to the nearby main camp of one of the clans. Here over the next few days they were introduced to numerous members of local and distant tribes and became the subject of several corroborees. During the following months, Morrill and the other survivors were taught how to gather food, snare wildfowl and were able to speak some of the language.

After a time, a large gathering occurred, which consisted of over a thousand people, some of whom were from tribes a fair distance to the south. Morrill, together with the captain and his wife, decided to join with these people when they returned south. They subsequently lived with a group of Biri Gubba people who resided in the Port Denison area. The boy went to live with a tribe further to the south. After two years, the boy, the captain and his wife had died and Morrill, now the only survivor of the shipwreck, became lonely and returned to live with the clan at Mount Elliot.

Morrill continued to live around Mount Elliot as a member of this tribe, living a traditional Aboriginal lifestyle, for year after year. He was given the name Karckynjib-Wombil-Mooney, learnt eight local dialects of the Biri language and shared in their customs, which he later documented. Occasionally, his fellow tribespeople would advise him that other white men had passed near to shore on ships. In 1860, George Elphinstone Dalrymple landed at Cape Cleveland during an expedition and encountered the local people. Morrill later wrote how tribesmen attempted to explain the presence of Morrill to Dalrymple through signs and gesticulations but Dalrymple interpreted this as hostility and members of his group shot dead one of the Aboriginal men and wounded another.

== Encountering British colonisation ==
With the coming of Dalrymple by sea, Morrill and the Mount Elliot people also noticed other British coming by land. A neighbouring tribe reported to them how a white man came with horses and shot dead a man participating a funeral ceremony. They later approached the man on the horse, who was probably missing colonist Mr Salisbury Humphrey, and killed him. Stray cattle also entered the region. Another report was given to them of how a lot of white and black people on horseback were "shooting down" the Port Denison tribe which Morrill had lived with previously.

By this stage it was 1863 and Morrill decided to shift away south from the Mount Elliot tribe to live on the Burdekin River where he thought he would be better placed to approach one of the British colonisers. He and members of the tribe were afraid that he would be mistaken for an Aboriginal and be shot. These fears were soon magnified when it was conveyed to them that 15 members of the Burdekin River tribe were shot dead by the Native Police. It was decided that the best means of survival of both Morrill and the Mount Elliot tribe was for him to approach the new Jarvisfield sheep station established by Edward Spencer Antill, and try to make contact with some of the stockmen.

Morrill firstly washed himself in a creek to make himself "as white as possible" and then climbed on top of the boundary fence of the sheep station to avoid being bitten by the station's dogs. From this position he yelled out "What cheer, shipmates" to some stockmen in a hut, who seeing a naked "red or yellow man standing on the rails", came out armed with a firearm. Before they had time to use the gun, Morrill managed to yell in his near forgotten English: "do not shoot me, I am a British object - a shipwrecked sailor." The stockmen took him to their hut where they fed him bread and tea. The bread got stuck in his throat and the tea was too sweet with Morrill later writing that he wasn't hungry anyway because he and his tribe had caught and feasted on 20 small wallabies earlier that day.

Morrill came to the conclusion that if the Mount Elliot tribe were to approach the sheep station they would certainly be killed. He told the stockmen that before he returned to British society he would first have to warn his tribe to move toward the coast and stay away from the farms. The stockmen agreed but warned him that if he didn't return by the morning they would contact the Native Police and have him and the tribe tracked down and shot. Morrill made his way back to the tribe where he warned them that the British "had come to take their land away" and that they had many guns to kill them if they came near. The Aboriginal people told Morrill to ask the British if they could at least retain some of the swampy ground north of the Burdekin River. The next morning Morrill had an emotional farewell to the tribe he had lived with for most of the previous 17 years and he struggled to overcome "the feeling of love I had for my old friends and companions." He returned to the stockmen's hut and within a couple of weeks was escorted to the nearby new British township of Bowen.

== Life in colonial British society ==
Once back in British society, Morrill became a minor celebrity. He was approached to give his story to numerous people, and within a few months of his return, he had written a short memoir of his time amongst the Aboriginal people in the region. He offered to act as a sort of liaison officer between the local Aboriginal people and the British to try and change a system that "so practically and so persistently insisted upon the destruction of the native". This offer was rejected by the colonial authorities, with one settler warning he would "give a small piece of lead" in Morrill's direction if he tried to implement amicable relations toward Aboriginal people in the vicinity of his squattage.

Morrill later accompanied a number of surveying expeditions to exploit his local knowledge. He was used by George Elphinstone Dalrymple in his 1864 expedition to Rockingham Bay where he was told to convey the message to the local Aboriginal people that they had come "to occupy the land and would shoot any who approached." Apart from this though, Morrill's life became unassuming. He took a job as a warehouse keeper and looked after the churchyards at Bowen, and in September 1864 he married a domestic servant by the name Eliza Ross.

== Death and legacy ==
Morrill's health rapidly declined once he had returned to British society. Rheumatic pains and swellings which occurred while living a traditional Indigenous lifestyle, worsened and flared throughout his body. Having lived so long without clothes, he had trouble adjusting wearing attire deemed essential in the colonial world. In October 1865, he was debilitated by a serious case of septic arthritis and died within two weeks. He was buried in the Bowen cemetery, which is now marked by a modest monument erected in 1963 by the Bowen Historical Society.

Before he died, Morrill and his wife had a son named Ross Morrill. It is claimed that he also had a daughter with an Aboriginal woman while he was living with the Mount Elliot clan, but Morrill never admitted to this. Descendants of Morrill continue to live in North Queensland. Morrill is one of only a few Europeans to have lived extensively within traditional Aboriginal Australian society. Other colonial figures who had similar experiences include William Buckley and Narcisse Pelletier.

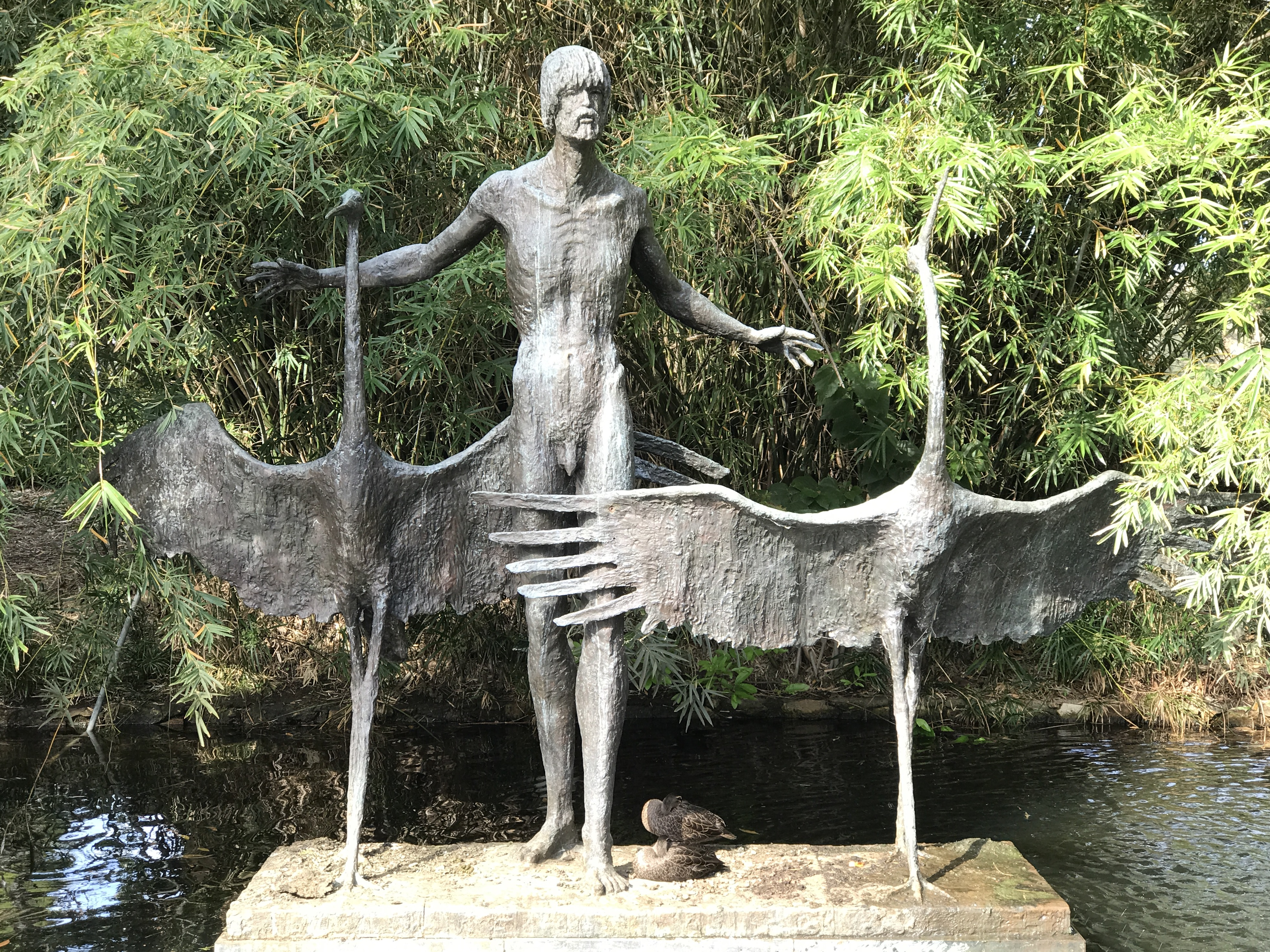
Jemmy Morrill and the Brolgas by Lindsay Daen in 1993. It is located in the City Botanic Gardens, Brisbane.

Revised editions of his memoirs were reprinted several times up to 1896, and a few biographies have since been published. Author David Malouf used Morrill's experiences in his 1993 novel Remembering Babylon. In 1983, a statue of Morrill was made as part of the centenary celebrations of the Pioneer Sugar Mill. This statue is located in the City Botanic Gardens.

=== Film ===
A film that was meant to be released in 2022, The Wild One, is based on the story of Morrill and the people who took him in. It is directed by Australian film maker Nathan Colquhoun and stars Matt Oxley, John Jarratt and Marlena Law.

Australian survival expert Mike Atkinson's film 'Modern Day Castaway' is loosely based on Morrill's experience, where Atkinson attempts to sail from Morrill's landing point to a rescue haven on Booby Island.
