= Richard Franck (captain) =

Richard Franck (1624?–1708) was a captain in the parliamentary army and writer.

== Life ==
Franck was born and educated at Cambridge. When the First English Civil War he went to London. His political sympathies were parliamentarian, and he had the rank of captain.

Franck left England for a tour in Scotland around 1656 or 1657. He returned to Nottingham, where he seems to have lived many years. About 1690 he went to New England, where his second book was written, and in 1694 was in London at the Barbican.

== Works ==
The book Northern Memoirs for which Franck is known is a specimen of euphuistic literature. After much front matter, it is in the form of a dialogue between Theophanes, Agrippa (a servant), Aquila (a friend), and himself, under the name Arnoldus. The style is turgid.

'Northern Memoirs' was written in 1658, put together in 1685, and not published till 1694. Its main interest centres in the places which Franck visited in Scotland, and the account of them which he gives. His route was by Carlisle and Dumfries to Glasgow; thence to Stirling, Perth, Forfar, and Loch Ness; then Sutherlandshire and Caithness, Cromarty, Aberdeen, Dundee, St. Andrews, Edinburgh, and Berwick. He made his way home by Morpeth.

Franck was the first to describe salmon fishing in Scotland, and both in that and trout-fishing with artificial fly he was a practical angler. He had read the Compleat Angler; he tells us that he had argued with Isaak Walton about pickerel weed breeding pike. He is the first angler to name the burbot, and commends the salmon of the River Thames.

Franck's second book was 'A Philosophical Treatise of the Original and Production of Things. Writ in America in a time of solitude,' London, 1687. The running head title of the work is 'Rabbi Moses.' It is written in the same high-flown language as Northern Memoirs. Franck may also have written 'The Admirable and Indefatigable Adventures of the Nine Pious Pilgrims ... to the New Jerusalem. Written in America in a time of Solitude and Divine Contemplation. By a Zealous Lover of Truth . . .' London (Morphew), 1708. The introductory matter is signed 'Philanthropes' as in Franck's other books.
