= Lower Burdekin languages =

Extinct unclassified languages of Australia

Lower Burdekin
- Bindal ?
- (geographic)
- Native to: Australia
- Region: Queensland
- Ethnicity: Bindal?
- Extinct: ca. 1900
- Language family: Pama–Nyungan: unclassified (Dyirbalic?); Lower Burdekin
- Dialects: Cunningham vocabulary; Gorton vocabulary; Mt. Elliot vocabulary

Language codes
- ISO 639-3: xbb
- Glottolog: bind1234 Cunningham list bind1235 Gorton list bind1236 Mount Elliot list
- AIATSIS: E61 Bindal
- Lower Burdekin languages (green) among other Pama–Nyungan (tan)

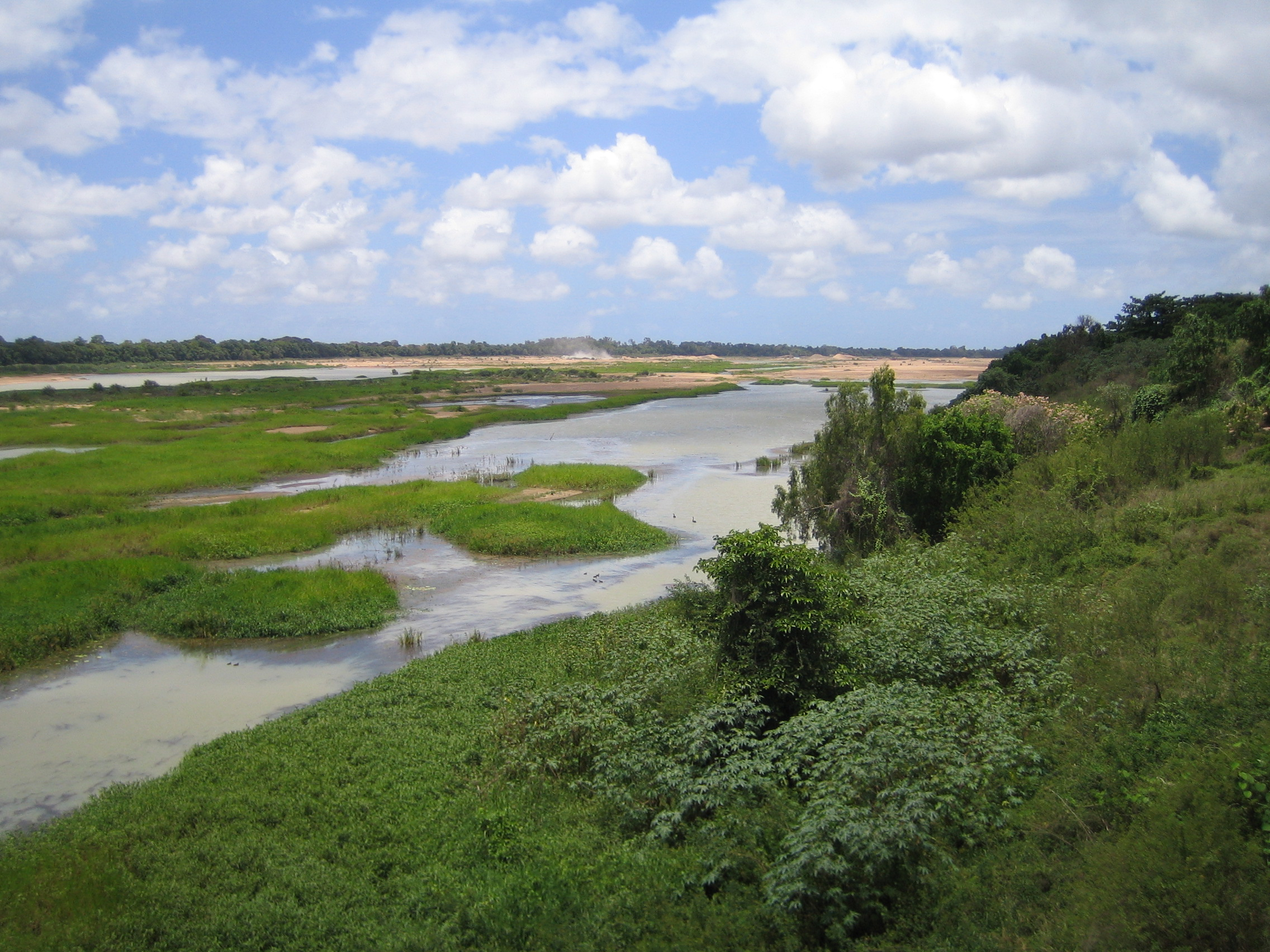
The Burdekin River in 2005

The Lower Burdekin languages are a geographical grouping of three distinct Aboriginal languages, spoken around the mouth of the Burdekin River in north Queensland. One short wordlist in each was collected in the 19th century, and published in the second volume of The Australian Race in 1886. These languages have since gone extinct, with no more having been recorded. Due to the paucity of the available data, almost nothing of their grammatical structure is known.

The three languages may have been Maric. However, Breen analysed two of the lists and concluded that they were different languages, neither Maric. He presumes that one of them was Bindal.

== Wordlist ==
English gloss	Cunningham vocabulary	Gorton vocabulary
Kangaroo	hoora	wootha
Opossum	moonganna	goong
Tame dog	oogier	minde
Emu	kowwerra	goondaloo
Black duck	yammooroo	buggininulli
Wood duck	mumboogooba	detto
Pelican	boloona	booloon
Laughing jackass	kowurgurra	kookaburra
Native companion	braroogan	buberenulli
White cockatoo	digooi	bugina
Crow	wyaguna	wethergun
Swan	woergerella	
Egg	wyoorda	werroo
Track of a foot	dooigooburra	
Fish	weenburra	kooia
Lobster	koongooya	goonaway
Crayfish	goombarroo	
Mosquito	kowearoo	dee
Fly	karoovella	
Snake	oongullab	wormbaloo
The Blacks	murre	
A Blackfellow		
A Black woman	wurrungooa	gungan
2 Blacks		
3 Blacks		
Nose	urrooa	woodroo
Hand	mobirra	mulbroo
One	warmina	
Two	blareena	bool
Three	kudjua	ka
Four	kulburra	
Father	kiya	yaba, yabo
Mother	younga	yanga
Elder sister	kootha	
Elder brother	wabooa	
A young man	karrebella	thillagal
An old man	booingermunna	bunganan
An old woman	boingergunna	bulnagun
A baby	mullererammoo	
A White man	yooarroo	
Children	erroomunna	
Head	kurria	kabbon
Eye	mudjura	deburri
Ear	awbilla	wobbilla
Mouth	da	yawirra
Teeth	irra	woonung
Hair of the head	gunnarri	
Beard	thungier	thungi
Thunder	degoroo	digoro
Grass	wudthoor	quwytho
Tongue	thullamia	
Stomach	bunboona	borlo
Breasts	woorga	wuggunna
Thigh	toomburra	thoombur
Foot	dingooburra	bulliger
Bone	bulbanna	
Blood	gwiburri	moondtha
Skin	yoolanna	uline
Fat	towie	koonoo, goomo
Bowels	gurroona	kullinga
Excrement	goonna	goonna
War-spear	nirremoo	woomburro
Reed-spear	wollaburra	
Wommera or throwing-stick	birrana	
Shield	goolmurri	gooldinare
Tomahawk	bulgooa	nubanin
Canoe	kobbetheba	bettel-bettel
Sun	burgorri	kartri
Moon	bowarri	
Star	bunjoldi	tor, bangala
Light	burgungubba	
Dark	wooroowobba	moonoo
Cold	didoora	detto
Heat	towarroo	
Day	woorabunda	
Night	wooroonga	woormooga
Fire	wygunna	booninin
Water	kowara	thoolanoo
Smoke	toogar	
Ground	nannier	numera
Wind	quioona	queeyon
Rain	yoogana	broothi
Wood	doola	dulla
Stone	burreea	burtheroo
Camp	yaamba	yamba
Yes	yea	umba
No	kurra	kateka
I	iyooa	
You	yindooa	
Bark	bulgan	boogoo
Good		
Bad	kooyooa	
Sweet	kowangubba	
Food	igango	
Hungry	nagnoora	kabbil
Thirsty	dthunginna	
Eat	igango	
Sleep	boogoora	boogooroo
Drink	bithungo	bitthana
Walk	kunnaigo	
See	timmi	thimmi
Sit	thunnango	thunara
Yesterday	yambowerroe	
To-day	nilla	nilla
To-morrow	burgenda	burringa
Where are the Blacks?	ondia murre?	
I don't know	kurra mira	
Plenty	qniarilla [sic]	
Big		wiarra
Little	wa-baw-au-boona	wabungam
Dead	waulgoona	wolgoon
By-and-by	thagoo	
Come on	kowa	
