= Outback Mike =

Australian adventurer and filmmaker

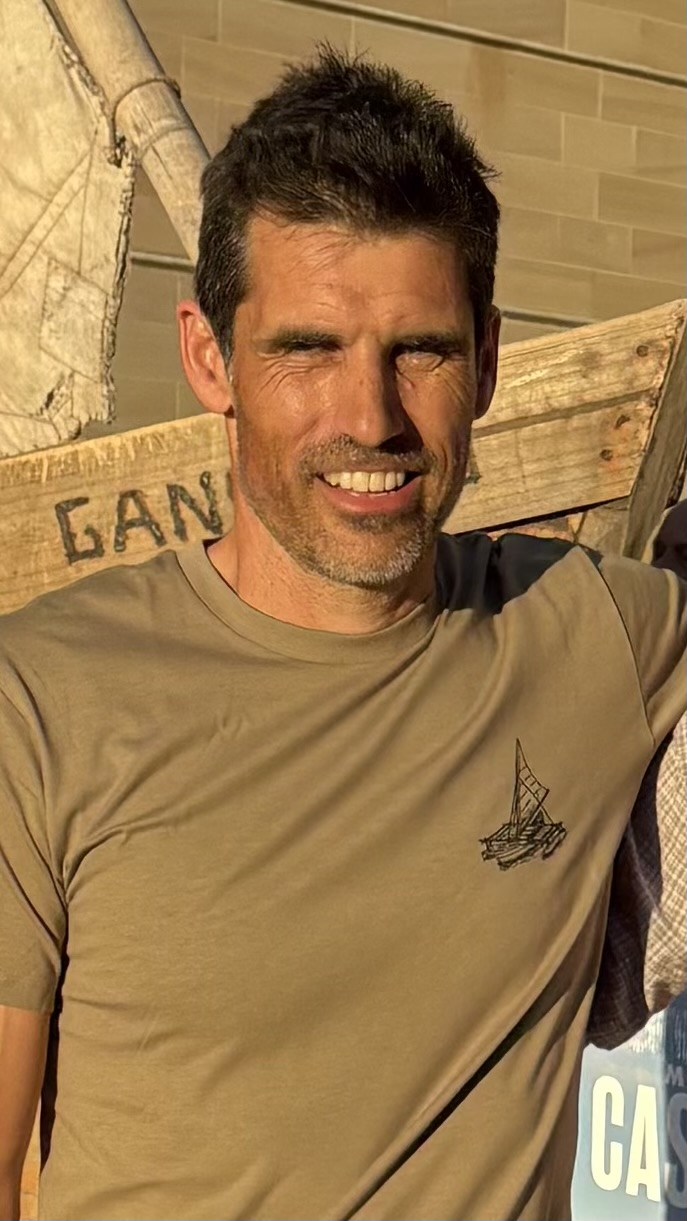
- Atkinson in October, 2025
- Born: Michael Atkinson; 1977 or 1978 (age 46–47)
- Occupations: Survival instructor; Filmmaker; RAAF pilot (former)
- Known for: Alone Australia; Filmmaking

YouTube information
- Channel: Outback Mike
- Years active: 2017-present
- Subscribers: 101K
- Views: 19.5 million
- Last updated: October 6, 2025
- Website: outbackmike.com

Michael Atkinson, popularly known as Outback Mike, is an Australian adventurer, filmmaker, author, and survival instructor. He has appeared on the first season of Alone Australia, and is known for undertaking solo survival adventures recreating historic expeditions, which he records and publishes as films.

Atkinson's first film details a six week survival expedition across the Kimberly in Western Australia. He is currently touring Australia for the release of his second film, 'Modern Day Castaway', featuring his journey along the Great Barrier Reef in North Queensland, Australia, in a dugout canoe.

Atkinson spend most of his career as a pilot in the Royal Australian Air Force, to which he attributes his survival skills.

== Early life and military career ==
Michael Atkinson was born in Canberra on August 22, 1976. He developed an interest and ambition in survival skills at an early age.

Atkinson served in the Royal Australian Air Force and the Royal Australian Army as a pilot for over twenty years, flying Kiowa helicopters in the army and Hornet jets in the air force. During his military service, he became skilled in various survival techniques, particularly during his time in Darwin, Northern Territory, where he was posted to NORFORCE, a regiment of the army consisting mainly of Indigenous soldiers who patrol remote areas of the Northern Territory. Atkinson attributes much of his bush tucker knowledge and skills such as spearfishing to traditional Aboriginal methods and techniques.

== Major expeditions and filmmaking ==
Atkinson is known for filming and publishing his survival expeditions unsupported. He often recreates historical expeditions and journeys of past explorers.

=== Surviving the Outback (2017) ===
Atkinson's first major film was originally titled Surviving the Kimberly, but was re-titled to suit international audiences. The film follows his four week expedition across the Kimberley in Western Australia, modelled on the 1932 stranding and journey of German aviators Hans Bertram and Adolf Klausmann.

=== Modern-Day Castaway (2021) ===
Atkinson's second major film is based on the experience of James Morrill, an English sailor who was shipwrecked off the coast of Queensland in 1846. 21 people from the wreck successfully boarded a makeshift raft, on which they drifted for four weeks, although all but Morrill ended up dying either on the raft or at their eventual landing point near modern-day Townsville. He was found and taken in by a local clan of Aboriginal Australians, where he lived for 17 years.

Atkinson's film documents his attempt to "escape" Morrill's situation by building a dugout canoe and sailing up the coast along the Great Barrier Reef, before rounding Cape York Peninsula to arrive at Booby Island, the site of a rescue haven for repairs and supplies in the early days of colonisation.

== Alone Australia ==
Atkinson appeared in the first season of Alone Australia, a survival reality television series in which contestants attempt to survive for a long as possible, unassisted in the wilderness, with only a limited amount of survival equipment. Atkinson survived 64 days before being forcibly medically evacuated due to low blood pressure and malnutrition. He was the runner-up behind winner Gina Chick, who survived 67 days.
