= Cape Cleveland, Queensland =

Cape Cleveland
- Suburb
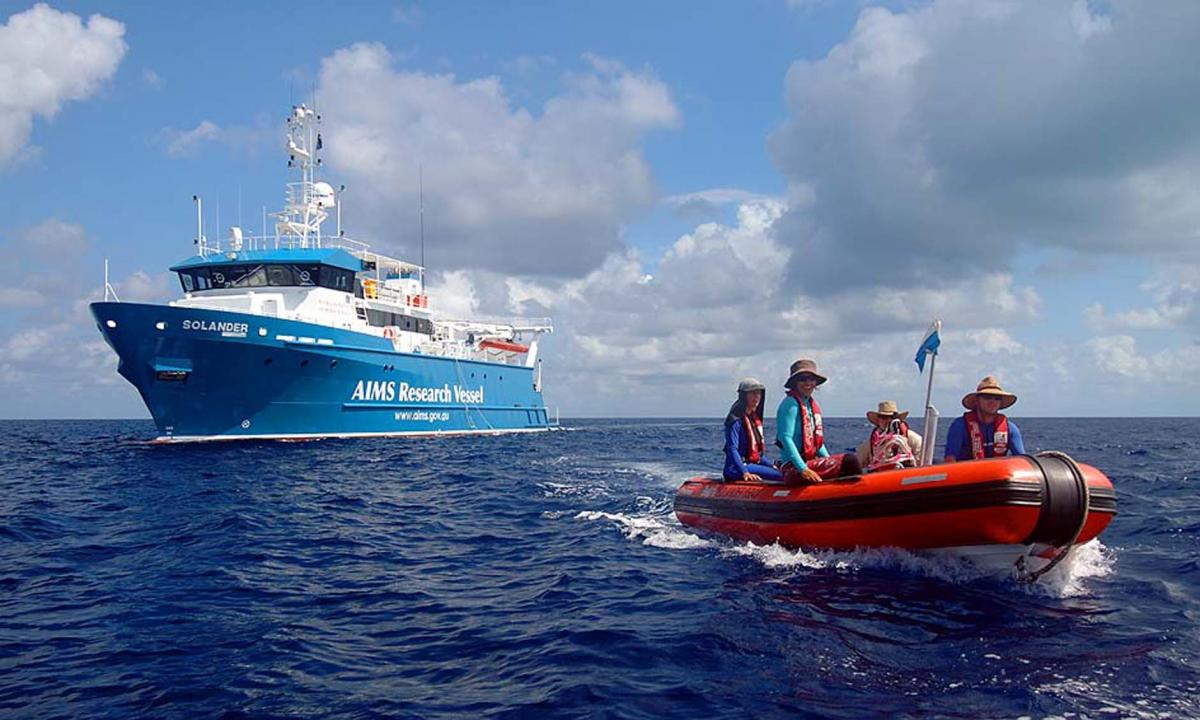
- Tender departing the RV Solander, one of the research vessels at the Australian Institute of Marine Science.jpg

- Interactive map of Cape Cleveland
- Coordinates: 19.3155°S 147.0097°E
- Country: Australia
- State: Queensland
- City: Townsville
- LGA: City of Townsville
- Location: 32.7 km (20.3 mi) E of Annandale; 35.7 km (22.2 mi) ESE of Townsville CBD; 1,305 km (811 mi) NNW of Brisbane

Government
  - State electorate: Burdekin
  - Federal division: Dawson

Area
  - Total: 224.0 km^{2} (86.5 sq mi)

Population
  - Total: 128 (2021 census)
  - Density: 0.5714/km^{2} (1.480/sq mi)
- Time zone: UTC+10:00 (AEST)
- Postcode: 4810
Suburbs around Cape Cleveland
Cleveland Bay	Coral Sea	Coral Sea
Stuart; Nome	Cape Cleveland	Cungulla
Mount Elliot	Cromarty	Giru

Cape Cleveland is a rural locality in the City of Townsville, Queensland, Australia. In the 2021 census, Cape Cleveland had a population of 128 people.

== Geography ==
The locality is bounded to the north-west by Cleveland Bay (19.2142°S 146.8998°E), to the north by the Coral Sea, to the north-west by Bowling Green Bay (19.3653°S 147.2533°E).

Cleveland Bay has smaller side bays of:

- White Rock Bay 19.2410°S 147.0031°E
- Red Rock Bay (19.2007°S 147.0202°E)

while Bowling Green Bay has smaller side bays of:

- Paradise Bay (19.2348°S 147.0458°E)
- Chunda Bay (19.2848°S 147.0495°E)

The locality has a number of headlands, including:

- Red Rock Point, on the north-west coast to the immediate south of Red Rock Bay (19.2031°S 147.0189°E)
- Cape Cleveland, the northernmost point of the locality, separating Cleveland Bay and Bowling Green Bay (19.1822°S 147.0138°E)
- Cape Woora, on the north-east coast to the south of Paradise Bay (19.2561°S 147.0598°E)
- Cape Ferguson, on the north-east coast to the immediate north of Chunda Bay (19.2763°S 147.0609°E)

The coastline of the locality has the following beaches:

- Launs Beach, on the north-west coast to the south of White Rock Bay (19.2642°S 146.9907°E)
- Long Beach, on the north-west coast to the south of Red Rock Point (19.2196°S 147.0188°E)
- Big Beach, on the north-east coast (19.3740°S 147.0976°E) extending to neighbouring Cungulla

The locality has a number of mountains, from north to south:

- Mount Cleveland on the headland Cape Cleveland (19.2564°S 147.0300°E) 558 metres (1,831 ft) above sea level
- The Cone (19.3936°S 147.0798°E) 94 metres (308 ft)
- Feltham Cone (also known as Mount Burrumbush) (19.4282°S 147.0735°E) 279 metres (915 ft)

The Bruce Highway and North Coast railway line form a small section of the south-west boundary with Mount Elliot. The locality was once served by the now-abandoned Clevedon railway station (19.3964°S 147.0220°E) beside the junction of the Bruce Highway and Cape Cleveland Road.

Much of the locality is within the Bowling Green Bay National Park and the Bowling Green Bay Conservation Park, which extend into the neighbouring localities of Mount Elliot, Cromarty, and Giru, and beyond. Apart from these protected areas and marshland in the west of the locality, there is a small area of rural residential development centred on Riley Road, some grazing on native vegetation, and some unused marshland. Around Cape Ferguson at the end of Cape Cleveland Road is a 207.4-hectare (512-acre) land parcel which is the headquarters of the Australian Institute of Marine Science(19.2676°S 147.0558°E), where research into tropical marine science is undertaken.

== History ==
The area takes its name from the headland Cape Cleveland, named by Captain Cook on his first voyage to the Pacific in 1770. Cook gave no reason for the name, but it is possible it was in honour of John Clevland, a former Secretary to the British Admiralty. Cook's original choice of name was "Iron Head", but this was crossed and replaced in a revision of his log shortly after leaving the cape.

== Demographics ==
In the 2011 census, Cape Cleveland had a population of 124 people.

In the 2016 census, Cape Cleveland had a population of 155 people.

In the 2021 census, Cape Cleveland had a population of 128 people.

== Heritage listings ==
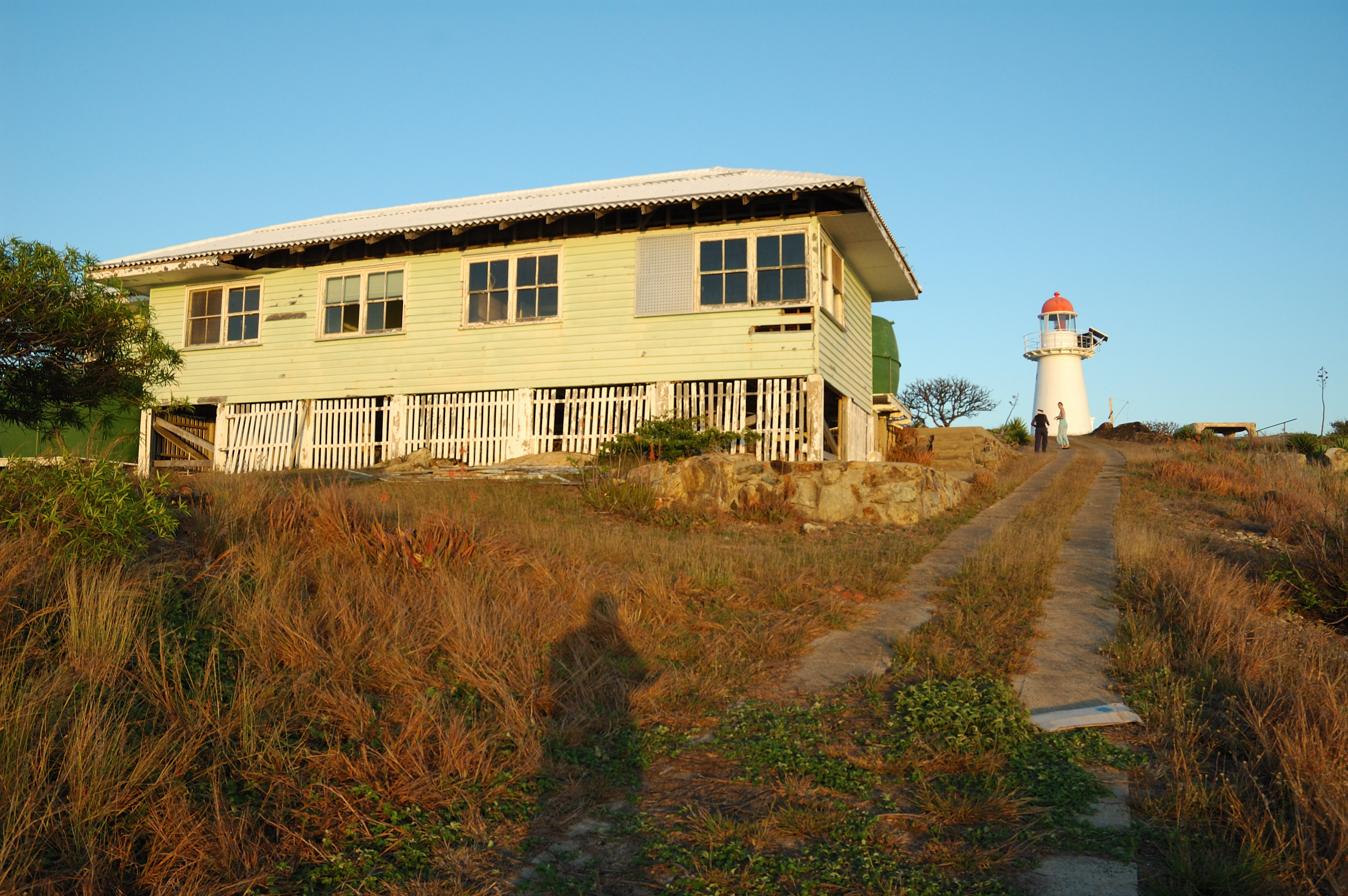
Cape Cleveland Light keepers house and lighthouse

Cape Cleveland has a number of heritage-listed sites, including:

- Cape Cleveland Lighthouse, Cape Cleveland (19.1829°S 147.0155°E)

== Education ==
There are no schools in Cape Cleveland. The nearest government primary schools are Giru State School in neighbouring Giru to the south-east and Wulguru State School in Wulguru to the west. The nearest government secondary school is William Ross State High School in Annandale, Townsville.

== Attractions ==
The public can book tours of the Australian Institute of Marine Science between March and October. As at 2021, the tours have been suspended due to the COVID pandemic.

The Cape Cleveland Lighthouse is in private ownership, but visitors are welcome by arrangement and basic camping facilities are available. There is no road access, so the options are either a long bushwalk or by ferry or with an organised tour.
