= Bowling Green Bay National Park =

National park in Australia

- IUCN category II (national park)
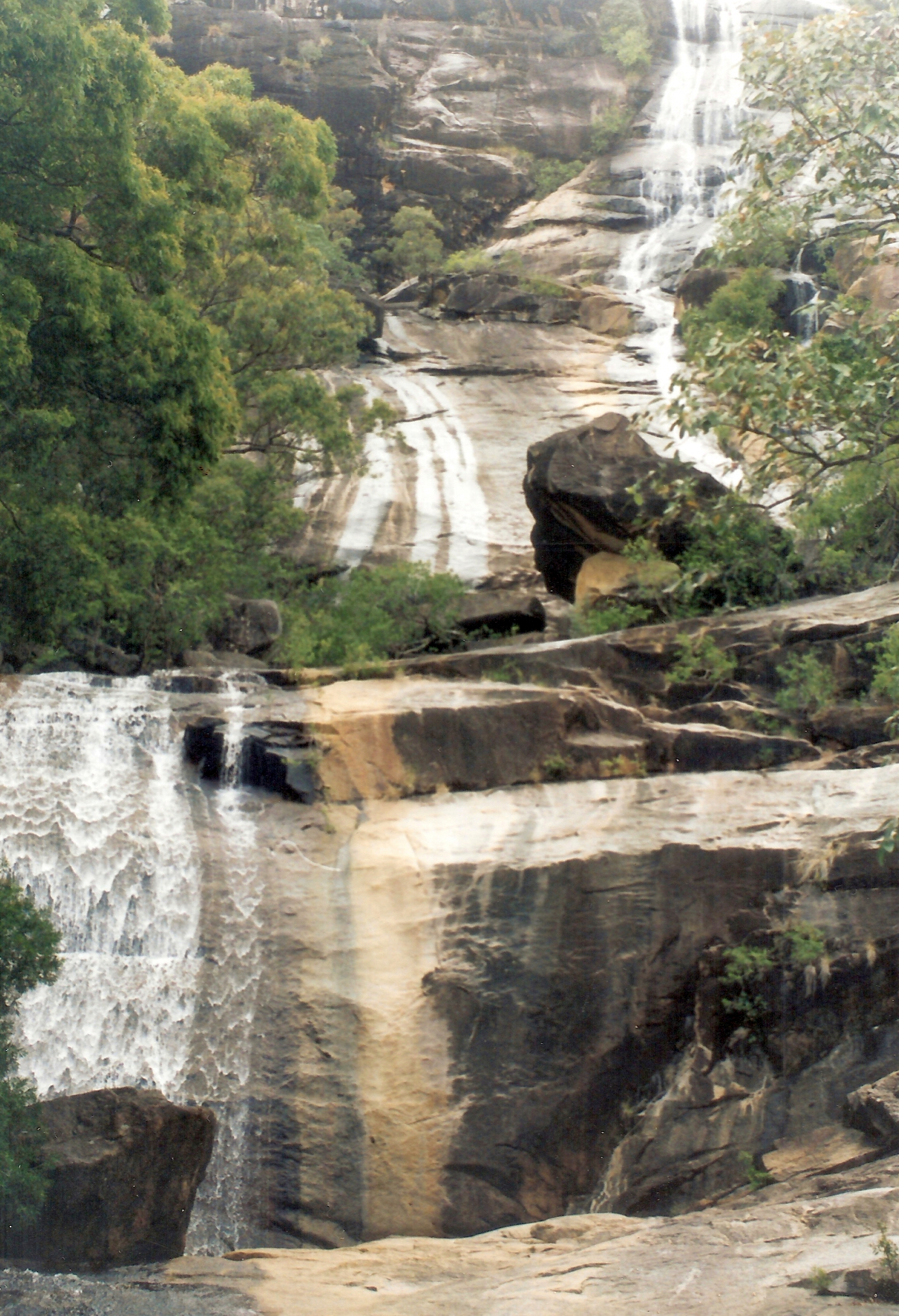
- Alligator Creek Falls, 1997

- Location within Queensland
- Location: Queensland
- Nearest city: Townsville
- Coordinates: 19°12′48″S 147°02′02″E
- Area: 554 km^{2} (214 sq mi)
- Established: 1977
- Governing body: Queensland Parks and Wildlife Service
- Website: https://parks.des.qld.gov.au/parks/bowling-green-bay

Bowling Green Bay is a national park in the City of Townsville and Shire of Burdekin, Queensland, Australia, 1,103 km northwest of Brisbane, and 28 km south of Townsville and 59 km north of Ayr. It is a Ramsar Convention listed site. The park protects diverse range of habitats including the rugged, forested landscape surrounding Mount Elliot and Saddle Mountain as well as coastal estuaries between Cape Cleveland and Cape Bowling Green.

== Landforms ==
Mount Elliot rises 1,342 m and has numerous creeks on its eastern slopes, of which, Alligator Creek is the most important. The creek is a popular place to swim and to watch birds drinking the creek's water or feeding on riparian vegetation.

The parks incorporates the floodplains of the Haughton River. This includes one of the largest wetlands on the east coast of Australia. The wetland arose as the coastal streams deposited material into the calm waters of Bowling Green Bay. It is composed of mud and sand flats, swamps, isolated hills, mangrove forests and inter-tidal flats. Behind the areas where mangroves grow are bare salt pan. These wide expanses are a unique characteristic of North Queensland wetlands produced by comparatively low rainfall and a short wet season that never washes the salt away.

== Fauna ==
The brolga and magpie goose find habitat in the sedge swamps of Bowling Green Bay. The park is one of the best places to see the rarely observed zitting cisticola. Other bird species include the whistling duck, black duck, spoonbill, ibis and jabiru. Crocodiles are found in the estuarine and swamp areas.

== Facilities ==
Camping in the park in permitted at the Alligator Creek campground. Bush camping is permitted at Cape Bowling Green. No open fires or domestic animals are permitted in the park.

== Access ==
Access to the park is via the Bruce Highway. Cape Bowling Green is accessible via the village of Alva Beach.

== See also ==
- Protected areas of Queensland
