= Giru, Queensland =

Giru
- Town
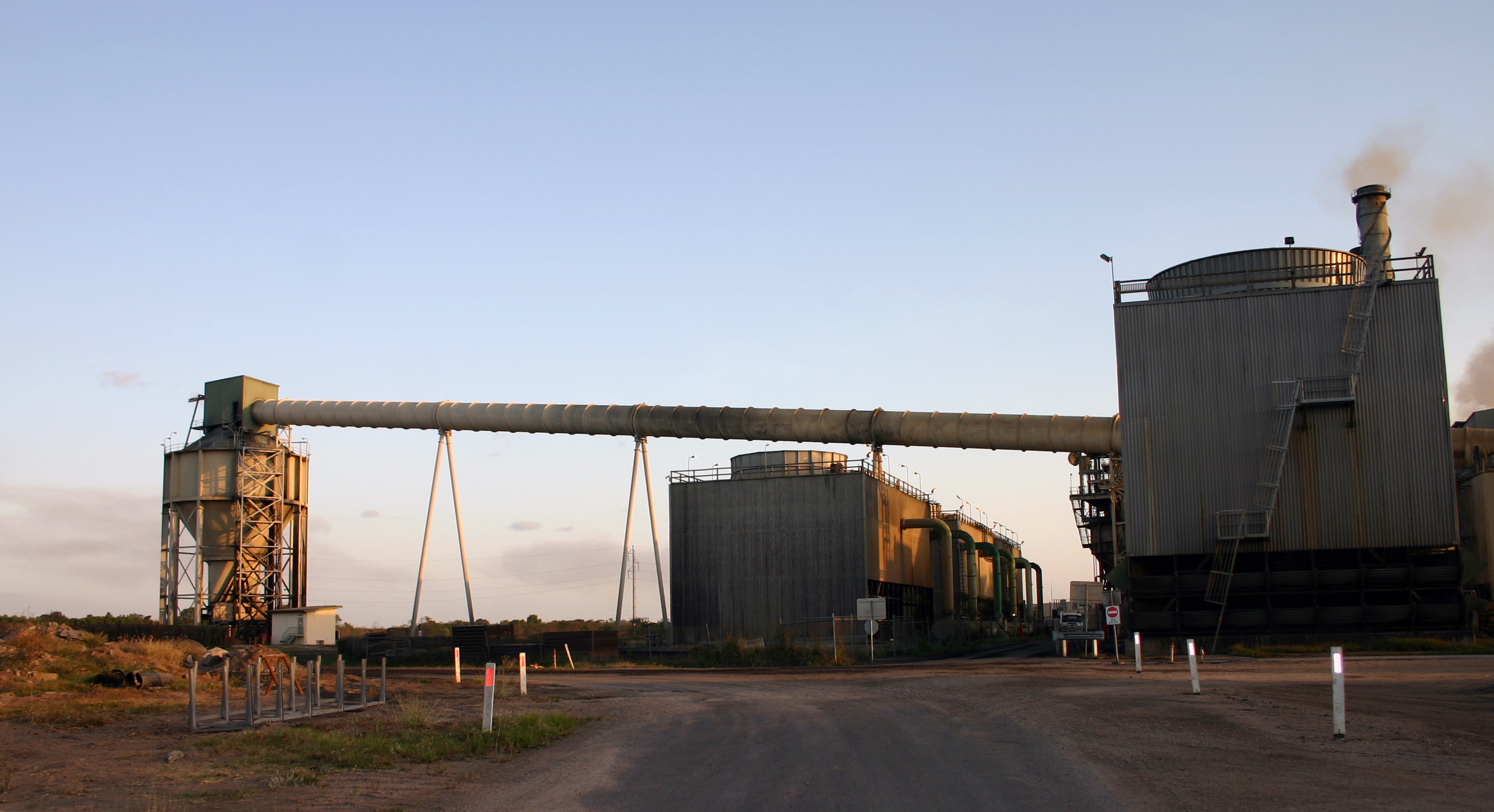
- Sugar mill at Giru

- Interactive map of Giru
- Coordinates: 19.5125°S 147.1072°E
- Country: Australia
- State: Queensland
- LGA: Shire of Burdekin
- Location: 39.5 km (24.5 mi) WNW of Ayr; 54.0 km (33.6 mi) SE of Townsville; 1,283 km (797 mi) NNW of Brisbane

Government
  - State electorate: Burderkin
  - Federal division: Dawson

Area
  - Total: 77.8 km^{2} (30.0 sq mi)

Population
  - Total: 387 (2021 census)
  - Density: 4.974/km^{2} (12.883/sq mi)
- Time zone: UTC+10:00 (AEST)
- Postcode: 4809
Localities around Giru
Cape Cleveland	Coral Sea	Jerona
Cromarty	Giru	Jerona
Mount Surround	Shirbourne	Horseshoe Lagoon

Giru is a rural town and coastal locality in the Shire of Burdekin, Queensland, Australia, situated on the Haughton River, 54 kilometres (34 mi) south-east of Townsville. In the 2021 census, the locality of Giru had a population of 387 people.

== Geography ==
Giru is mainly sugarcane farms. The Invicta sugar mill in Giru is owned by Wilmar Sugar Cane Limited with three iconic chimney stacks.

The Bruce Highway bypasses the town.

== History ==
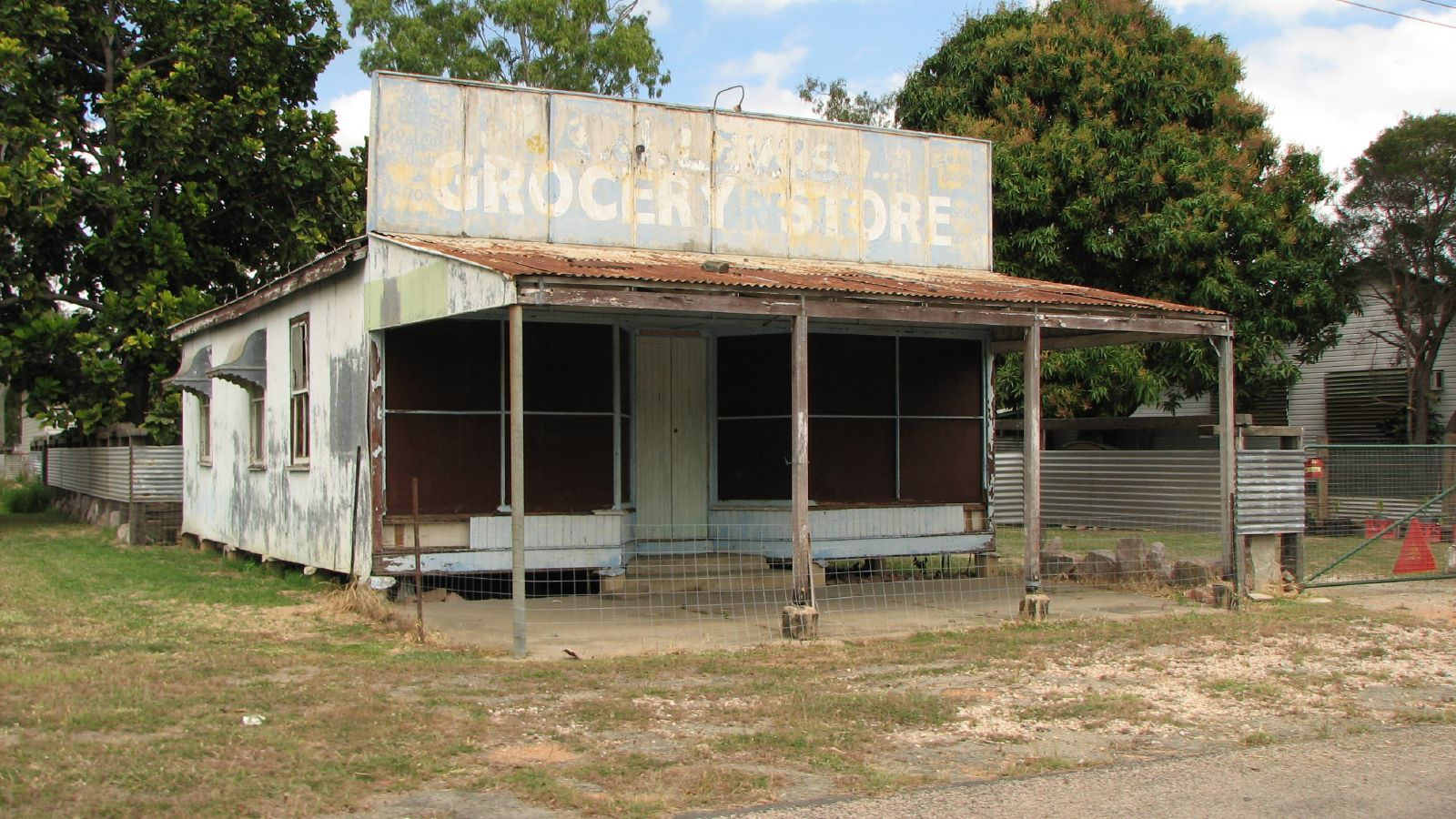
Giru grocery store

The name of the town and the locality derives from the railway station name, assigned on 31 March 1916, derived from "goru", a type name for a species of sugarcane from New Guinea which was successfully experimented with and widely grown in the district.

The Invicta Sugar Mill was originally located on the Richmond River in New South Wales. In 1906, it was relocated to Bucca near the Kolan River near Bundaberg. In 1919, it was moved north to the Haughton River in the Burdekin district, where the township of Giru grew around it. It commenced crushing there under the same name on 4 August 1921.

On Saturday 1 May 1926, the School of Arts Hall was officially opened with a dance.

The Giru Post Office opened by 1922.

Giru State School opened on 1 October 1924. The school celebrated its golden jubilee (50th anniversary) in 1974 and its centenary in 2024.

St Joseph's School opened in 1945 and closed in 1998.

The Palm Creek Folk Festival was an annual event held in Giru on the Queen's Birthday public holiday, and spanned four days. It commonly featured known and up-and-coming bands from several music genres, ranging from folk to alternative.

== Demographics ==
In the 2016 census, the locality of Giru had a population of 354 people.

In the 2021 census, the locality of Giru had a population of 387 people.

== Economy ==
Giru is noted for the Invicta Sugar Mill, which is owned by Wilmar Sugar. The company crushes about 3,000,000 tonnes (3,300,000 tons) of raw sugar cane annually.

== Education ==
Giru State School is a government primary (Prep–6) school for boys and girls at 45–51 Luxton Street (19.5129°S 147.1096°E). In 2017, the school had an enrolment of 46 students with 4 teachers (3 full-time equivalent) and 4 non-teaching staff (3 full-time equivalent).

There is no government secondary school in Giru. The nearest government secondary school is Ayr State High School in Ayr to the east.

== Amenities ==
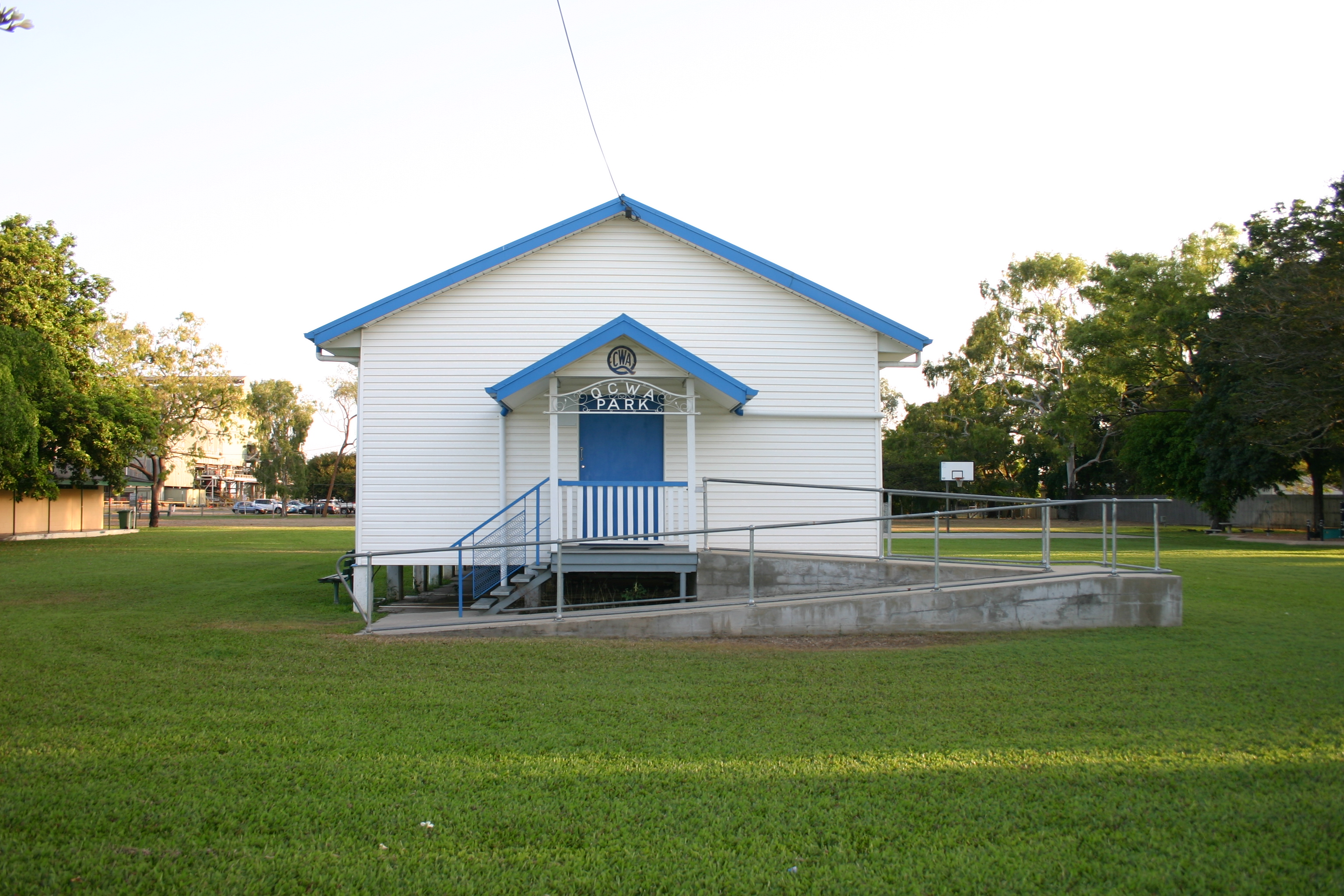
Queensland Country Women's Association rooms, Giru

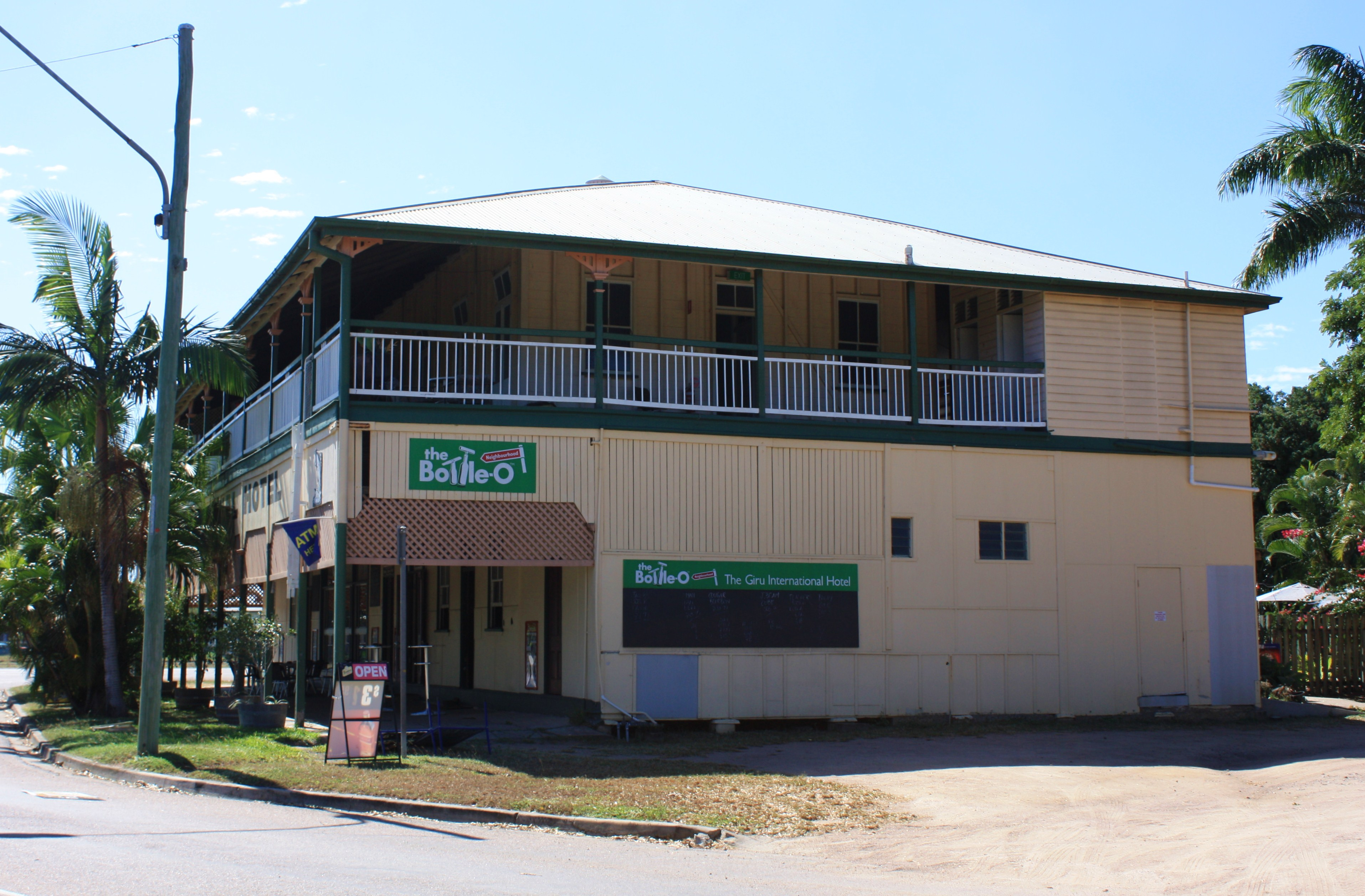
Giru International Hotel

The Giru branch of the Queensland Country Women's Association meets at the CWA Hall at 9 Carey Street.

Giru School of Arts Hall is at 3 Invicta Street (19.51556°S 147.10452°E).

There is a bowling club, and the main source of accommodation is the Giru International Hotel.

== Attractions ==
There is serious game fishing in the region, as the barramundi and grunter are highly sought after.

In September every year, the Giru Show is held, offering activities such as food stalls, homemade cake shops and show rides, horse rides, and an animal farm, as well as a display of several pieces of farming equipment.

== See also ==
- Giru railway station
- List of tramways in Queensland
