= Haughton River =

Haughton
- Location of Haughton River mouth in Queensland
- Etymology: Richard Houghton

Location
- Country: Australia
- State: Queensland
- Region: North Queensland

Physical characteristics
- Source: Leichhardt Range
  - location: below Haughton Valley
  - coordinates: 19°49′40″S 146°38′06″E
  - elevation: 173 m (568 ft)
- Mouth: Bowling Green Bay
  - location: Coral Sea
  - coordinates: 19°23′25″S 147°07′51″E
  - elevation: 0 m (0 ft)
- Length: 110 km (68 mi)
- Basin size: 2,172.4 km^{2} (838.8 sq mi)
- Discharge
  - location: Near mouth
  - average: 9.9 m^{3}/s (310 GL/a)

Basin features
- Tributaries
  - left: Major Creek, Reid River
- National park: Bowling Green Bay National Park

The Haughton River is a river in North Queensland, Australia.

== Course and features ==
The headwaters of the river rise in the Haughton Valley of the Leichhardt Range near Mingela and flow in a north easterly direction almost immediately crossing the Flinders Highway. The river then passes between Mount Prince Charles and Mount Norman then past Glendale. Major Creek discharges into the Haughton under Major Creek Mountain and the river continues crossing the Bruce Highway just south of Giru. The Haughton enters Bowling Green Bay National Park and finally discharges into Bowling Green Bay south of Townsville near Cungulla and then into the Coral Sea.

The assessed catchment area of the river varies, with one estimate of the area at 8,690 square kilometres (3,360 sq mi) and another assessed at 4,051 square kilometres (1,564 sq mi). Of this latter area, 316 square kilometres (122 sq mi) is composed of estuarine wetlands.

The floodplain area of the catchment also holds valuable wetlands, parts of the Bowling Green Bay National Park and Ramsar site (QDEH 1991) are listed in the Directory of Important Wetlands. The upper part of the catchment has few permanent waterholes. An estimated 77% of the catchment is cleared, cattle grazing is the dominant land use in the area, with the production of sugarcane and other forms of horticulture taking up most of the catchment area. An area of 328 square kilometres (127 sq mi) is protected.

A total of 27 species of fish have been found in the river, including the glassfish, Pacific short-finned eel, blue catfish, milkfish, fly-specked hardyhead, mouth almighty, empire gudgeon, barred grunter, barramundi, oxeye herring, mangrove jack, eastern rainbowfish, bony bream, freshwater longtom and seven-spot archerfish.

== Etymology ==
The river was named in 1861 after Richard Houghton, a stockman, by his friend the pastoralist and explorer James Cassady. Originally named Houghton River, it was renamed to the current spelling by the Surveyor General in 1950 at the request of local residents and the electoral office.

== See also ==
- List of rivers of Australia § Queensland
