= Electoral results for the district of Burdekin =

Queensland, Australia, district election results

This is a list of electoral results for the electoral district of Burdekin in Queensland state elections.

== Members for Burdekin ==
| Member | Party | Term |
|---|---|---|
| Arthur Coburn | Independent | 1950–1969 |
| Val Bird | Country | 1969–1974 |
| Val Bird | National | 1974–1983 |
| Mark Stoneman | National | 1983–1998 |
| Jeff Knuth | One Nation | 1998–1999 |
| Jeff Knuth | Independent | 1999 |
| Jeff Knuth | Country Party Queensland | 1999–2000 |
| Jeff Knuth | City Country Alliance | 2000–2001 |
| Steve Rodgers | Labor | 2001–2004 |
| Rosemary Menkens | National | 2004–2008 |
| Rosemary Menkens | Liberal National | 2008–2015 |
| Dale Last | Liberal National | 2015–present |

== Election results ==
=== Elections in the 2020s ===
2024 Queensland state election: Burdekin
| Party | Candidate | Votes | % | ±% |
|---|---|---|---|---|
| Liberal National | Dale Last | 16,035 | 52.00 | +12.30 |
| Labor | Anne Baker | 8,102 | 26.27 | −5.43 |
| Katter's Australian | Daniel Carroll | 2,630 | 8.53 | −5.67 |
| One Nation | Andrew Elborne | 2,342 | 7.59 | +0.59 |
| Family First | Amanda Nickson | 922 | 2.99 | +2.99 |
| Greens | Ben Watkin | 808 | 2.62 | +0.62 |
| Total formal votes | | 30,839 | 96.67 | −0.04 |
| Informal votes | | 1,061 | 3.33 | +0.04 |
| Turnout | | 31,900 | 87.55 | −0.41 |
Two-party-preferred result
| Liberal National | Dale Last | 20,293 | 65.80 | +8.75 |
| Labor | Anne Baker | 10,546 | 34.20 | −8.75 |
| Liberal National hold | | Swing | +8.75 | |

2020 Queensland state election: Burdekin
| Party | Candidate | Votes | % | ±% |
|---|---|---|---|---|
| Liberal National | Dale Last | 11,792 | 39.70 | +8.01 |
| Labor | Michael Brunker | 9,425 | 31.73 | −4.23 |
| Katter's Australian | Sam Cox | 4,212 | 14.18 | +14.18 |
| One Nation | Clive Remmer | 2,080 | 7.00 | −22.34 |
| NQ First | Carolyn Moriarty | 900 | 3.03 | +3.03 |
| Greens | Jack Smith | 600 | 2.02 | −0.99 |
| Animal Justice | Dominique Thiriet | 419 | 1.41 | +1.41 |
| United Australia | Benjamin Wood | 274 | 0.92 | +0.92 |
| Total formal votes | | 29,702 | 96.71 | 0.00 |
| Informal votes | | 1,012 | 3.29 | +0.00 |
| Turnout | | 30,714 | 87.96 | −0.28 |
Two-party-preferred result
| Liberal National | Dale Last | 16,944 | 57.05 | +6.25 |
| Labor | Michael Brunker | 12,758 | 42.95 | −6.25 |
| Liberal National hold | | Swing | +6.25 | |

=== Elections in the 2010s ===
2017 Queensland state election: Burdekin
| Party | Candidate | Votes | % | ±% |
|---|---|---|---|---|
| Labor | Michael Brunker | 10,524 | 36.0 | +4.6 |
| Liberal National | Dale Last | 9,274 | 31.7 | −3.0 |
| One Nation | Sam Cox | 8,587 | 29.3 | +26.0 |
| Greens | Mathew Bing | 880 | 3.0 | +0.6 |
| Total formal votes | | 29,265 | 96.7 | −1.6 |
| Informal votes | | 997 | 3.3 | +1.6 |
| Turnout | | 30,262 | 88.2 | +1.1 |
Two-party-preferred result
| Liberal National | Dale Last | 14,866 | 50.8 | +2.2 |
| Labor | Michael Brunker | 14,399 | 49.2 | −2.2 |
| Liberal National notional gain from Labor | | Swing | +2.2 | |

2015 Queensland state election: Burdekin
| Party | Candidate | Votes | % | ±% |
|---|---|---|---|---|
| Liberal National | Dale Last | 10,510 | 37.30 | −10.69 |
| Labor | Angela Zyla | 7,522 | 26.70 | +6.12 |
| Katter's Australian | Steven Isles | 3,396 | 12.05 | −14.21 |
| Palmer United | Jacinta Warland | 2,330 | 8.27 | +8.27 |
| Independent | BJ Davison | 2,306 | 8.18 | +8.18 |
| One Nation | Belinda Johnson | 1,305 | 4.63 | +4.63 |
| Greens | Lindy Collins | 807 | 2.86 | +0.14 |
| Total formal votes | | 28,176 | 98.03 | −0.07 |
| Informal votes | | 567 | 1.97 | +0.07 |
| Turnout | | 28,743 | 90.90 | −0.07 |
Two-party-preferred result
| Liberal National | Dale Last | 12,201 | 52.88 | −9.59 |
| Labor | Angela Zyla | 10,872 | 47.12 | +47.12 |
| Liberal National hold | | Swing | −9.59 | |

2012 Queensland state election: Burdekin
| Party | Candidate | Votes | % | ±% |
|---|---|---|---|---|
| Liberal National | Rosemary Menkens | 12,873 | 47.99 | −2.49 |
| Katter's Australian | Ronald Wadforth | 7,044 | 26.26 | +26.26 |
| Labor | Angela Zyla | 5,520 | 20.58 | −23.18 |
| Greens | Pete Johnson | 732 | 2.73 | −3.03 |
| Family First | Amanda Nickson | 655 | 2.44 | +2.44 |
| Total formal votes | | 26,824 | 98.10 | −0.10 |
| Informal votes | | 489 | 1.90 | +0.10 |
| Turnout | | 27,107 | 90.96 | −0.45 |
Two-candidate-preferred result
| Liberal National | Rosemary Menkens | 13,808 | 62.47 | +9.32 |
| Katter's Australian | Ronald Wadforth | 8,294 | 37.53 | +37.53 |
| Liberal National hold | | Swing | +9.32 | |

=== Elections in the 2000s ===
2009 Queensland state election: Burdekin
| Party | Candidate | Votes | % | ±% |
|---|---|---|---|---|
| Liberal National | Rosemary Menkens | 13,438 | 50.5 | +5.2 |
| Labor | Les Walker | 11,648 | 43.8 | −3.4 |
| Greens | Maria Macdonald | 1,532 | 5.8 | +1.8 |
| Total formal votes | | 26,618 | 98.1 | |
| Informal votes | | 489 | 1.9 | |
| Turnout | | 27,107 | 91.4 | |
Two-party-preferred result
| Liberal National | Rosemary Menkens | 13,705 | 53.1 | +4.0 |
| Labor | Les Walker | 12,082 | 46.9 | −4.0 |
| Liberal National gain from Labor | | Swing | +4.0 | |

2006 Queensland state election: Burdekin
| Party | Candidate | Votes | % | ±% |
|---|---|---|---|---|
| National | Rosemary Menkens | 10,104 | 48.1 | +12.7 |
| Labor | Steve Rodgers | 9,169 | 43.7 | +6.8 |
| Greens | Anja Light | 863 | 4.1 | +0.5 |
| Family First | Amanda Nickson | 852 | 4.1 | +4.1 |
| Total formal votes | | 20,988 | 97.9 | −0.2 |
| Informal votes | | 441 | 2.1 | +0.2 |
| Turnout | | 21,429 | 91.6 | −0.4 |
Two-party-preferred result
| National | Rosemary Menkens | 10,589 | 52.4 | −2.0 |
| Labor | Steve Rodgers | 9,619 | 47.6 | +2.0 |
| National hold | | Swing | −2.0 | |

2004 Queensland state election: Burdekin
| Party | Candidate | Votes | % | ±% |
|---|---|---|---|---|
| Labor | Steve Rodgers | 7,911 | 36.9 | +0.2 |
| National | Rosemary Menkens | 7,605 | 35.4 | +12.7 |
| Independent | Jeff Knuth | 3,265 | 15.2 | +15.2 |
| One Nation | Merle Poletto | 1,921 | 8.9 | −10.8 |
| Greens | Mike Rubenach | 762 | 3.6 | +3.6 |
| Total formal votes | | 21,464 | 98.1 | −0.3 |
| Informal votes | | 418 | 1.9 | +0.3 |
| Turnout | | 21,882 | 92.0 | −0.8 |
Two-party-preferred result
| National | Rosemary Menkens | 10,478 | 54.4 | +9.5 |
| Labor | Steve Rodgers | 8,787 | 45.6 | −9.5 |
| National gain from Labor | | Swing | +9.5 | |

2001 Queensland state election: Burdekin
| Party | Candidate | Votes | % | ±% |
|---|---|---|---|---|
| Labor | Steve Rodgers | 7,808 | 36.7 | +3.8 |
| National | Terry Morato | 4,836 | 22.7 | −3.2 |
| City Country Alliance | Jeff Knuth | 4,439 | 20.9 | +20.9 |
| One Nation | Merle Poletto | 4,180 | 19.7 | −15.2 |
| Total formal votes | | 21,263 | 98.4 | |
| Informal votes | | 341 | 1.6 | |
| Turnout | | 21,604 | 92.8 | |
Two-party-preferred result
| Labor | Steve Rodgers | 8,863 | 55.1 | +14.0 |
| National | Terry Morato | 7,215 | 44.9 | +44.9 |
| Labor gain from One Nation | | Swing | +14.0 | |

=== Elections in the 1990s ===
1998 Queensland state election: Burdekin
| Party | Candidate | Votes | % | ±% |
|---|---|---|---|---|
| One Nation | Jeff Knuth | 7,657 | 33.1 | +33.1 |
| Labor | Les Walker | 7,307 | 31.6 | −5.9 |
| National | Terry Morato | 6,693 | 28.9 | −29.0 |
| Australia First | Elaine Steley | 963 | 4.2 | +4.2 |
| Democrats | Maurie Nichols | 535 | 2.3 | +2.3 |
| Total formal votes | | 23,155 | 98.7 | +0.3 |
| Informal votes | | 296 | 1.3 | −0.3 |
| Turnout | | 23,451 | 93.8 | +2.1 |
Two-candidate-preferred result
| One Nation | Jeff Knuth | 12,725 | 59.4 | +59.4 |
| Labor | Les Walker | 8,692 | 40.6 | +1.2 |
| One Nation gain from National | | Swing | +59.4 | |

1995 Queensland state election: Burdekin
| Party | Candidate | Votes | % | ±% |
|---|---|---|---|---|
| National | Mark Stoneman | 12,598 | 57.9 | +17.0 |
| Labor | Jenny Hill | 8,156 | 37.5 | −7.1 |
| Independent | Alex Caldwell | 992 | 4.6 | +4.6 |
| Total formal votes | | 21,746 | 98.5 | +0.4 |
| Informal votes | | 338 | 1.5 | −0.4 |
| Turnout | | 22,084 | 91.7 | |
Two-party-preferred result
| National | Mark Stoneman | 13,037 | 60.6 | +8.5 |
| Labor | Jenny Hill | 8,488 | 39.4 | −8.5 |
| National hold | | Swing | +8.5 | |

1992 Queensland state election: Burdekin
| Party | Candidate | Votes | % | ±% |
|---|---|---|---|---|
| Labor | Jenny Hill | 9,303 | 44.6 | −1.2 |
| National | Mark Stoneman | 8,531 | 40.9 | +5.5 |
| Liberal | Steve Szendrey | 3,031 | 14.5 | −4.3 |
| Total formal votes | | 20,865 | 98.0 | |
| Informal votes | | 414 | 2.0 | |
| Turnout | | 21,279 | 92.0 | |
Two-party-preferred result
| National | Mark Stoneman | 10,648 | 52.0 | +1.4 |
| Labor | Jenny Hill | 9,810 | 48.0 | −1.4 |
| National hold | | Swing | +1.4 | |

=== Elections in the 1980s ===
1989 Queensland state election: Burdekin
| Party | Candidate | Votes | % | ±% |
|---|---|---|---|---|
| National | Mark Stoneman | 5,229 | 41.1 | −11.5 |
| Labor | Don Wallace | 5,002 | 39.3 | +6.0 |
| Liberal | Anthony Chandler | 2,506 | 19.7 | +9.3 |
| Total formal votes | | 12,737 | 97.3 | −0.9 |
| Informal votes | | 358 | 2.7 | +0.9 |
| Turnout | | 13,095 | 93.1 | −0.4 |
Two-party-preferred result
| National | Mark Stoneman | 7,249 | 56.9 | −5.0 |
| Labor | Don Wallace | 5,488 | 43.1 | +5.0 |
| National hold | | Swing | −5.0 | |

1986 Queensland state election: Burdekin
| Party | Candidate | Votes | % | ±% |
|---|---|---|---|---|
| National | Mark Stoneman | 6,570 | 52.6 | +5.2 |
| Labor | Richard Tucker | 4,163 | 33.3 | −6.6 |
| Liberal | Colin Jackson | 1,295 | 10.4 | −1.8 |
| Independent | Laurence Fabrellas | 457 | 3.7 | +3.7 |
| Total formal votes | | 12,485 | 98.2 | |
| Informal votes | | 231 | 1.8 | |
| Turnout | | 12,716 | 93.5 | |
Two-party-preferred result
| National | Mark Stoneman | 7,728 | 61.9 | +5.5 |
| Labor | Richard Tucker | 4,757 | 38.1 | −5.5 |
| National hold | | Swing | +5.5 | |

1983 Queensland state election: Burdekin
| Party | Candidate | Votes | % | ±% |
|---|---|---|---|---|
| National | Mark Stoneman | 5,376 | 47.4 | −7.1 |
| Labor | Peter Rehbein | 4,532 | 39.9 | −5.6 |
| Liberal | Ian MacDonald | 1,335 | 11.8 | +11.8 |
| Independent | Keven Proberts | 108 | 1.0 | +1.0 |
| Total formal votes | | 11,351 | 98.9 | 0.0 |
| Informal votes | | 129 | 1.1 | 0.0 |
| Turnout | | 11,480 | 94.4 | +2.9 |
Two-party-preferred result
| National | Mark Stoneman | 6,437 | 56.7 | +2.2 |
| Labor | Peter Rehbein | 4,914 | 43.3 | −2.2 |
| National hold | | Swing | +2.2 | |

1980 Queensland state election: Burdekin
| Party | Candidate | Votes | % | ±% |
|---|---|---|---|---|
| National | Val Bird | 5,783 | 54.5 | −5.8 |
| Labor | Peter Rehbein | 4,836 | 45.5 | +5.8 |
| Total formal votes | | 10,619 | 98.9 | 0.0 |
| Informal votes | | 120 | 1.1 | 0.0 |
| Turnout | | 10,739 | 91.5 | −2.8 |
| National hold | | Swing | −5.8 | |

=== Elections in the 1970s ===
1977 Queensland state election: Burdekin
| Party | Candidate | Votes | % | ±% |
|---|---|---|---|---|
| National | Val Bird | 6,181 | 60.3 | −6.0 |
| Labor | Alex Brown | 4,076 | 39.7 | +10.8 |
| Total formal votes | | 10,257 | 98.9 | |
| Informal votes | | 117 | 1.1 | |
| Turnout | | 10,374 | 94.3 | |
| National hold | | Swing | −10.0 | |

1974 Queensland state election: Burdekin
| Party | Candidate | Votes | % | ±% |
|---|---|---|---|---|
| National | Val Bird | 6,603 | 66.3 | +11.9 |
| Labor | Clyde Ferris | 2,875 | 28.9 | −10.9 |
| Queensland Labor | Emil Liebrecht | 475 | 4.8 | −1.0 |
| Total formal votes | | 9,953 | 98.9 | 0.0 |
| Informal votes | | 110 | 1.1 | 0.0 |
| Turnout | | 10,063 | 93.3 | +0.6 |
Two-party-preferred result
| National | Val Bird | 6,998 | 70.3 | +11.1 |
| Labor | Clyde Ferris | 2,955 | 29.7 | −11.1 |
| National hold | | Swing | +11.1 | |

1972 Queensland state election: Burdekin
| Party | Candidate | Votes | % | ±% |
|---|---|---|---|---|
| Country | Val Bird | 4,883 | 54.4 | +22.5 |
| Labor | Ronald Nuttall | 3,568 | 39.8 | −1.7 |
| Queensland Labor | Emil Liebrecht | 518 | 5.8 | −1.9 |
| Total formal votes | | 7,245 | 96.6 | |
| Informal votes | | 252 | 3.4 | |
| Turnout | | 7,497 | 93.0 | |
Two-party-preferred result
| Country | Val Bird | 5,313 | 59.2 | +6.2 |
| Labor | Ronald Nuttall | 3,656 | 40.8 | −6.2 |
| Country hold | | Swing | +6.2 | |

=== Elections in the 1960s ===
1969 Queensland state election: Burdekin
| Party | Candidate | Votes | % | ±% |
|---|---|---|---|---|
| Labor | Ronald Nuttall | 3,007 | 41.5 | +17.6 |
| Country | Val Bird | 2,313 | 31.9 | +31.9 |
| Liberal | Stanley Pearce | 1,369 | 18.9 | −0.5 |
| Queensland Labor | Emil Liebrecht | 556 | 7.7 | −3.4 |
| Total formal votes | | 7,245 | 96.6 | −1.7 |
| Informal votes | | 252 | 3.4 | +1.7 |
| Turnout | | 7,497 | 93.0 | −1.4 |
Two-party-preferred result
| Country | Val Bird | 3,927 | 54.2 | +54.2 |
| Labor | Ronald Nuttall | 3,318 | 45.8 | +2.7 |
| Country gain from Independent | | Swing | +54.2 | |

1966 Queensland state election: Burdekin
| Party | Candidate | Votes | % | ±% |
|---|---|---|---|---|
| Independent | Arthur Coburn | 3,318 | 45.6 | −10.6 |
| Labor | Herbert O'Brien | 1,739 | 23.9 | −4.3 |
| Liberal | Stanley Pearce | 1,415 | 19.4 | +19.4 |
| Queensland Labor | Oliver Anderson | 810 | 11.1 | −4.6 |
| Total formal votes | | 7,282 | 98.3 | +0.2 |
| Informal votes | | 124 | 1.7 | −0.2 |
| Turnout | | 7,406 | 94.4 | −0.5 |
Two-candidate-preferred result
| Independent | Arthur Coburn | 4,262 | 58.5 | −5.5 |
| Liberal | Stanley Pearce | 3,020 | 41.5 | +41.5 |
| Independent hold | | Swing | −5.5 | |

1963 Queensland state election: Burdekin
| Party | Candidate | Votes | % | ±% |
|---|---|---|---|---|
| Independent | Arthur Coburn | 3,888 | 56.2 | +5.5 |
| Labor | Thomas Niven | 1,949 | 28.2 | +8.6 |
| Queensland Labor | Oliver Anderson | 1,085 | 15.7 | −13.9 |
| Total formal votes | | 6,922 | 98.1 | −1.1 |
| Informal votes | | 133 | 1.9 | +1.1 |
| Turnout | | 7,055 | 94.9 | +1.8 |
Two-candidate-preferred result
| Independent | Arthur Coburn | 4,430 | 64.0 | |
| Labor | Thomas Niven | 2,492 | 36.0 | |
| Independent hold | | Swing | N/A | |

1960 Queensland state election: Burdekin
| Party | Candidate | Votes | % | ±% |
|---|---|---|---|---|
| Independent | Arthur Coburn | 3,529 | 50.7 | |
| Queensland Labor | Colin McCathie | 2,063 | 29.6 | |
| Labor | Fred Page | 1,367 | 19.6 | |
| Total formal votes | | 6,959 | 99.2 | |
| Informal votes | | 53 | 0.8 | |
| Turnout | | 7,012 | 93.1 | |
| Independent hold | | Swing | | |

=== Elections in the 1950s ===
1957 Queensland state election: Burdekin
| Party | Candidate | Votes | % | ±% |
|---|---|---|---|---|
| Independent | Arthur Coburn | 4,145 | 52.0 | −11.9 |
| Labor | John Grafton | 2,268 | 28.5 | −4.8 |
| Queensland Labor | Oliver Andersen | 1,560 | 19.6 | +19.6 |
| Total formal votes | | 7,973 | 99.3 | +0.2 |
| Informal votes | | 54 | 0.7 | −0.2 |
| Turnout | | 8,027 | 96.2 | +1.3 |
| Independent hold | | Swing | −1.2 | |

1956 Queensland state election: Burdekin
| Party | Candidate | Votes | % | ±% |
|---|---|---|---|---|
| Independent | Arthur Coburn | 4,891 | 63.9 | +5.9 |
| Labor | Henry Skinner | 2,546 | 33.3 | −8.7 |
| Communist | Howard Connors | 215 | 2.8 | +2.8 |
| Total formal votes | | 7,652 | 99.1 | +0.5 |
| Informal votes | | 67 | 0.9 | −0.5 |
| Turnout | | 7,719 | 94.9 | −1.2 |
| Independent hold | | Swing | +7.3 | |

1953 Queensland state election: Burdekin
| Party | Candidate | Votes | % | ±% |
|---|---|---|---|---|
| Independent | Arthur Coburn | 4,337 | 58.0 | +5.5 |
| Labor | William Wall | 3,137 | 42.0 | −2.0 |
| Total formal votes | | 7,474 | 98.6 | −0.5 |
| Informal votes | | 107 | 1.4 | +0.5 |
| Turnout | | 7,581 | 96.1 | +4.5 |
| Independent hold | | Swing | +3.6 | |

1950 Queensland state election: Burdekin
| Party | Candidate | Votes | % | ±% |
|---|---|---|---|---|
| Independent | Arthur Coburn | 3,955 | 52.5 | |
| Labor | Ernest Russell | 3,318 | 44.0 | |
| Communist | Jack Penberthy | 267 | 3.5 | |
| Total formal votes | | 7,540 | 99.1 | |
| Informal votes | | 66 | 0.9 | |
| Turnout | | 7,606 | 91.6 | |
| Independent gain from Labor | | Swing | | |
