= Ayr Masonic Temple =

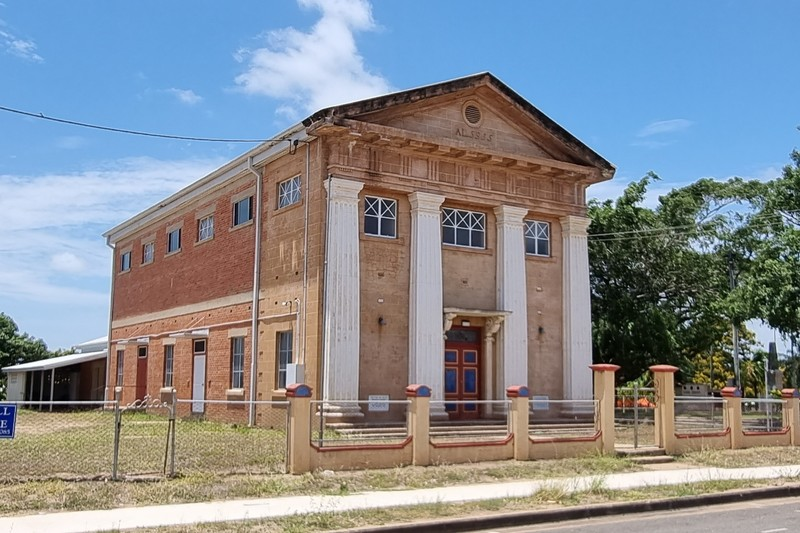
- Ayr Masonic Temple, 2021

- Location within Queensland
- 19.5784°S 147.4052°E
- Location: 118–120 Macmillan Street, Ayr, Shire of Burdekin, Queensland, Australia

History
- Design period: 1919–1930s (Interwar period)
- Built: 1935

Site notes
- Architectural style: Classicism

Queensland Heritage Register
- Official name: Ayr Masonic Temple; Lower Burdekin Masonic Temple / Ayr Masonic Centre
- Type: state heritage
- Designated: 25 February 2022
- Reference no.: 650273
- Type: Social and community: Hall-masonic / lodge / friendly or benefit society
- Theme: Creating social and cultural institutions: Organisations and societies
- Builders: Harry Lewer Percival

Ayr Masonic Temple is a heritage-listed masonic temple at 118–120 Macmillan Street, Ayr, Shire of Burdekin, Queensland, Australia. It was built in 1935 by Harry Lewer Percival. It is also known as Lower Burdekin Masonic Temple / Ayr Masonic Centre. It was added to the Queensland Heritage Register on 25 February 2022.

== History ==
Ayr Masonic Temple (1935) is a grand, two-storey masonry building at the corner of Mackenzie Street and Macmillan Street in Ayr, one block south-east of the town's main street, Queen Street. Replacing an earlier timber Masonic hall (1903) on the site, it was built as a temple for the Delta, Ayr, and Fuller Freemason lodges. As a large and elaborate masonry building, it demonstrates the growth and expansion of Freemasonry during the interwar period. In 2021, it remains an active Masonic temple for the Fuller Lodge.

Ayr is located approximately 70 kilometres (43 mi) south-east of Townsville, near Plantation Creek in the lower Burdekin River's delta, in the traditional land of the Bindal people. Pastoralism began in the Burdekin district in the 1860s; and the selection of land for agriculture, including maize growing and dairying, followed by the 1870s. Sugarcane was also being grown by 1880. Ayr, surveyed in 1882, grew as sugar farms, plantations and mills were established in the delta. The Ayr State School opened in 1886, and Ayr Divisional Board – previously part of the Thuringowa Divisional Board (1879) – was established in 1888. Based in Ayr, Ayr Divisional Board later became Ayr Shire Council in 1903, and Burdekin Shire Council in 1982. A private railway (Ayr Tramway), connecting Ayr to Stuart near Townsville, opened in 1901. At this time Ayr only had a population of 338 people. Although Cyclone Leonta damaged or destroyed most of the town's buildings in March 1903, Ayr was rebuilt, and a butter factory opened in 1904. The nearby sugar-growing towns of Brandon and Home Hill were surveyed in 1882 and 1911 respectively. A railway link to Bowen was completed in 1913. Ayr Tramway was taken over by the Queensland Government on 1 January 1911.

The Burdekin district, along with the Herbert district north of Townsville, became one of the four main sugar-growing regions in Queensland – the Herbert–Burdekin region (including Ingham, Home Hill and Ayr). This region produced about 20% of Queensland's sugar crop in both 1890 and 1940, and 40% in 2008. Although the Burdekin district had less rainfall than the Herbert district and the other sugar growing regions, water for irrigation was sourced from sub-artesian bores. The other three regions are: Northern (Tully to Cairns and Mossman), Mackay–Proserpine, and Southern (Moreton, Maryborough and Bundaberg.

When the Queensland sugar industry expanded during the 1920s and 1930s – even as the Great Depression was affecting most of Australia – the Burdekin district prospered as a result. By 1933, Ayr had a population of 4792 people, rising to 7000 by 1938. As the town grew, many notable public buildings were constructed during the interwar period, such as Ayr Shire Council Chambers (1922); Ayr Court House (1936); Ayr Post Office (1936); and Ayr State High School (1937).

Ayr Masonic Temple is a result of the growth and spread of Freemasonry in Queensland. Freemasonry has been described as "a fraternal association of men, based on the principles of brotherly love, relief and truth". Membership in Australia is open to all men who profess a belief in a Supreme Being and are of good character. "Craft", or "Blue Lodges" confer the three Masonic degrees of Entered Apprentice, Fellowcraft, and Master Mason. Additional degrees can be obtained if a Master Mason joins a chapter of the Royal Arch Masonic organisation (also known as a "Red Lodge").

Masonic halls or temples (the terms are interchangeable) have similar architectural style influences and layouts to accommodate Masonic rituals. The front facade of Masonic temples often had Classical Greek or Roman architectural influences, as the five orders of architecture (three Greek: Doric, Ionic, Corinthian, and two Roman: Tuscan and Composite) are significant within Freemasonry. The main ceremonies are held in a rectangular room called a lodge room, designed to evoke the Temple of Solomon under construction (an allegory for the process of personal development and enlightenment of a Mason). The lodge room usually has high windows to maintain privacy, especially if it is on the ground floor of a building. Seating is arranged around the perimeter of the room, so all members can observe the ceremonies conducted in the open central space, which has a central mosaic "pavement" (usually a checkerboard pattern). An elevated seat is located at the eastern side of the room for the Worshipful (or Right Worshipful) Master, the senior position in the lodge. Elevated, individual seats are also provided at the western and southern sides for the Senior Warden and the Junior Warden. The room usually contains an altar. The architecture, furniture, and decoration of lodges are rich in Masonic allegory and symbols. Among the most prominent symbols are the Square and Compasses, and the letter "G". Masonic temples often also contain social rooms, dining rooms, and other spaces.

The first "stationary" Freemasons' lodge in Australia (as opposed to a travelling lodge associated with a British naval vessel or regiment) was formed in Sydney in 1820: the Australian Social Lodge number 260 (Irish Constitution, or IC). Lodges were formed after being granted a charter under the constitutions of either the Irish, Scottish, or English Grand Lodges; with the first English Constitution (EC) lodge formed in Sydney in 1829, and the first Scottish Constitution (SC) lodge formed in 1844 in Melbourne. To allow a measure of administrative autonomy for the Australian lodges "given their distance from their parent Grand Lodges in the British " the Irish, English and Scottish lodges soon formed their own Provincial Grand Lodges, with Provincial Grand Masters: the Provincial Grand Lodge of New South Wales (EC), in 1849; the Provincial Grand Lodge (SC) of the province of Australia, in 1856; and the Provincial Grand Lodge (IC), in 1857. The three Constitutions in New South Wales later combined to form the United Grand Lodge of NSW, achieving full autonomy from their British Grand Lodges, in 1888. Not all lodges immediately joined their respective Provincial Grand Lodges.

The first lodge in Queensland, the North Australian Lodge (EC), met on 13 July 1859, at the newly opened Freemasons' Hotel in Albert Street, Brisbane, after petitioning the Provincial Grand Lodge of NSW (EC) for permission. Three more English constitution lodges soon followed: the Queensland Lodge, Ipswich (Queensland's first Masonic hall was later built in Ipswich), and the Prince of Wales Lodge, Brisbane, both in 1861; then the Leichardt Lodge in Rockhampton in 1862. The first Queensland lodge of the Irish Constitution (St Patrick, Brisbane) was formed in 1863, and the first lodge under the Scottish Constitution (St Andrew's, Brisbane) in 1864. A Provincial (later District) Grand Lodge (EC) was formed in Queensland in 1862, and the other two Constitutions in Queensland both formed provincial grand lodges in 1866. A Masonic hall was constructed for the Provincial Grand Lodge (EC) in 1867 on Albert Street, Brisbane, with a new hall in Alice Street in 1886. The Provincial Grand Lodge (EC) changed its name to District Grand Lodge in 1867, with the Provincial Grand Lodge (SC) doing likewise in 1880. The North Australian Lodge numbered 1098 on the roll of the United Grand Lodge of England but was later No. 1 on the roll of the United Grand Lodge of Queensland.

Masonic lodges soon spread geographically throughout Queensland, following the extension of the railways and the formation of new towns, with each of the three Constitutions chartering new lodges, and sometimes sharing a common Masonic hall. In 1904, 25 Irish lodges and 14 Scottish lodges formed the Grand Lodge of Queensland (GLQ) to gain autonomy from their parent grand lodges in Britain. The lodges of the GLQ were then renumbered, and those lodges and any new lodges formed under the GLQ from 1904 to 1921 were consequently designated "Queensland Constitution" (QC). Another 50 Scottish lodges, and 62 English lodges, however, refused to acknowledge the new organization, and continued under their respective District Grand Lodges until 1920, when they amalgamated under the Queensland Grand Lodge (QGL), in a transitional arrangement to facilitate a union with the GLQ the following year. In 1904 the District Grand Lodge (SC) was divided into southern (Queensland) and northern (North Queensland) districts.

In April 1921, the United Grand Lodge of Queensland (UGLQ) was formed, with 14,000 members in 281 lodges. All the UGLQ lodges were then renumbered, in order of the date of their consecration. Given the large size of Queensland, two District Grand Lodges were soon created: the District Grand Lodge of North Queensland (1922) at Townsville; and the District Grand Lodge of Carpentaria (1924) at Cairns. The Brisbane Masonic Temple was the headquarters for the UGLQ. It had four storeys plus basement and was dedicated in December 1930 on Ann Street, Brisbane, at a cost of £103,000, not including furniture and the land.

The membership of the UGLQ increased in the 1920s and 1930s, and dropped during World War II, before rapidly expanding. Membership was 22,196 in 1930; dropped to 17,190 in 1941, but recovered to 21,250 in 1946, and grew to 35,955 (in 469 lodges) in 1969. However, numbers later fell, to 24,103 members in 1990, and 10,375 (in 300 lodges) in 2009. The membership of the District Grand Lodge of North Queensland peaked in 1961, with 2,976 members in 40 lodges.

The first Masonic lodge in Ayr was formed in December 1896, when Delta 846 (SC) was consecrated and the officers of the lodge were installed: including Alexander Fraser as Right Worshipful Master, and Maxwell Henry Irving as Treasurer. A banquet was held at the Queens Hotel, Ayr afterwards. Initially, the Federal Hall or the Divisional Board Hall was used for lodge meetings. When the site of the current Masonic temple, 0.5 acres (0.20 ha) at the corner of Mackenzie Street and Macmillan Street, was obtained by the Freemasons for £30 in April 1902, Fraser and Irving were listed as trustees. Until there was a Masonic hall in Ayr, the Delta Lodge also held dance functions at the Federal Hall. Mackenzie Street and Macmillan Street were originally known as Khedive Street and Osman Street, but these names, which, like a number of original Ayr street names, had Ottoman Turkish origins, were changed c. 1920-21 after public pressure. The Delta Lodge's members then erected a highset timber Masonic hall on the site, which was used for meetings from March 1903. When Cyclone Leonta levelled the towns of Brandon and Ayr that same month, the Masonic hall was one of the few buildings to survive in Ayr. Heavily damaged, it was repaired and consecrated in July 1903. The first Masonic temple in Home Hill, which cost £960, was consecrated in 1925, and replaced in 1981.

By 1911, Ayr's population was 1236, and a second local Masonic lodge was formed in October that year: Ayr Masonic Lodge, 3588 (EC). This was soon followed by a GLQ lodge consecrated on 5 July 1913: Fuller 61 (QC), named after a prominent Townsville Mason. All three lodges were later renumbered, upon formation of the UGLQ, as Delta 112, Ayr 211, and Fuller 228. The Burdekin Royal Arch Chapter 378 (SC) was also meeting in Ayr's timber Masonic hall by 1916, and later used the current Masonic temple.

Despite its understory being available (and presumably enclosed) for use for public meetings by the 1920s, the timber Masonic hall soon proved to be too small, a fact noted after a dance there in 1931. Although the sugar industry allowed Ayr to prosper during the Great Depression, its effects were still present. The first Masonic hall was used by the Salvation Army in 1932 to serve a Sunday afternoon tea to 31 unemployed men camping in the town over the weekend. The three Ayr lodges, which had decided on a new hall in 1928, proceeded to raise funds for a new masonry building on the same site, through increased membership fees and assistance from the Ladies Masonic Committee, and it was reported in May 1934 that "in view of the rapid growth of the district and the great activity in building operations, considerable importance attaches to the decision ... to proceed shortly with the erection of a new Masonic Temple".

The new temple in Ayr was purpose built as the principal meeting place of the three Ayr lodges. The plans were commissioned by the Ayr Masonic Building Committee (also referred to as the Lower Burdekin Masonic Building Committee), chaired by Worshipful Brother Arthur Coburn, a former Worshipful Master of Fuller Lodge, and were approved in October 1934. It was claimed that "the new building ... will be a distinct asset and a splendid addition to the number of modern structures which are going up in different parts of the town".

The plans and construction of the Masonic temple were undertaken by Townsville builder, Harry Percival Lewer, who also built a number of concrete shops, and the Commonwealth Savings Bank, in Queen Street in Ayr during the 1930s.

The foundation stone for the new temple was laid on 9 December 1934, by the Right Worshipful District Grand Master of North Queensland, Arthur D Charge, with music for the ceremony provided by Ayr Competitive Choir, Ayr Male Choir; and Ayr Citizens' band. A casket containing "the usual records" was deposited "in the cavity under the stone". The building was expected to cost approximately £4,000. At the ceremony, the District Grand Master noted that Masonic character was based upon four great cornerstones – belief in a Supreme Being; a desire for nobility of character; loyalty to the throne and Empire; and the principle of service.

The new building was two-storey, with an imposing Classically inspired front finished in cement render and featuring giant Doric order pilasters. The ground floor accommodated a ballroom (also used as a public hall) 75 ft x 34 ft (22.9m x 10.4m), with an adjoining supper room, 31 ft x 27 ft (9.5m x 8.2m) in an attached, rear, single-storey service block. The upper floor accommodated an assembly room 12 ft x 34 ft (3.7m x 10.4m) and an adjoining lodge room 60 ft x 34 ft (18.3m x 10.4m). Although the building's facade and ballroom was intended to be faced with "freestone", concrete was used instead used.

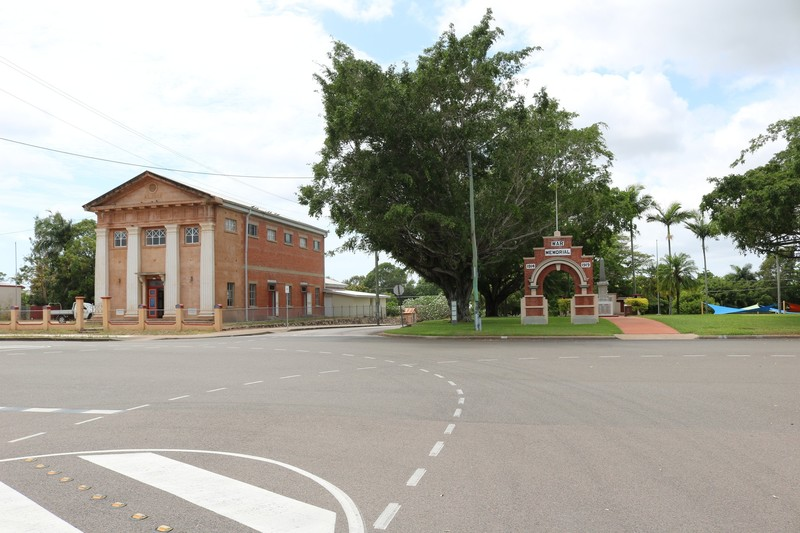
Ayr Masonic Temple, from the north-west in its streetscape, 2021

Ayr's Masonic temple, "claimed to be one of the most stately and beautiful buildings of its kind in Queensland", was officially opened and consecrated on 22 June 1935, with more than 300 brethren of the Masonic Order present, by the Pro. (acting) Grand Master of the UGLQ, the Most Worshipful Brother William Herbert Green. Green had been the Grand Master of the UGLQ in 1929–31 and 1932–4, but continued to act in place of his successor, Queensland's governor, Sir Leslie Orme Wilson (1934–46), as required during 1934–36. Green, then Member of the Queensland Legislative Assembly for Townsville, had also previously been District Grand Master of North Queensland, 1922–24. The Townsville Masonic Choir provided music for the ceremony, which was also attended by Masons from Charters Towers, Home Hill, Giru, Townsville, Bowen, and Proserpine. It was reported that "the edifice is a valuable addition to the architectural progress of the town, and a sign of the enterprising spirit of the local members of the craft", and that "both for size and architecture, the new Temple is the most outstanding building in Ayr, and taking into consideration the size of the town, it was acknowledged by the Grand Lodge Officers present ... to surpass easily all other Masonic buildings within the jurisdiction of Queensland". Later in 1935, another new Masonic temple, costing £12,000, was dedicated in Cairns. Ayr Masonic Temple has the lettering "AL 5935" on the front pediment. The Masonic calendar adds 4000 years to the Gregorian year, so "Anno Lucius 5935" (years since the believed creation of the earth c4000 BCE) is equivalent to 1935.

The previous night, a Grand Jubilee Commemoration Ball had been held at the new building, with more than 500 guests, the supper being provided by the Ladies Committee in a large marquee at the side of the old Masonic hall, which had also been requisitioned for the purpose. The old hall, which was sited next to the new building on its northeast side, was demolished in 1936 and some of its Masonic furniture moved into the new hall, including an altar, tracing boards, and Worshipful Master's and Wardens' pedestals, which are retained in the building in 2021. By 1936, there was a masonry and chain-wire fence in front of the temple (extant 2021).

The new Masonic temple in Ayr was one of the more impressive temples built in Queensland in the interwar period, especially given the relatively small population of Ayr. Most Masonic buildings of this period were modest, single-storey buildings constructed of timber, rather than masonry, and only a minority had classical detailing to their main façade. Of the 162 Masonic halls/temples still occupied by lodges in Queensland in 2005, 44 had been constructed from 1874 to 1917; 51 from 1919 to 1940; and 67 were built from 1942 to 2004. Of the 51 interwar temples, 12 were masonry (built of brick, concrete or stone); and 10 of these had classical style facades or columns (as opposed to only two of the interwar timber temples). Other than Ayr, examples of interwar, masonry, classical style Masonic temples, of two stories or more (in use in 2005) included: Wynnum, Mackay (Mackay Masonic Temple), Bundaberg (former drapery store), Longreach, Brisbane, Townsville, Cairns (Cairns Masonic Temple), and Innisfail.

Since its construction, the new temple's ballroom/public hall has been used for a variety of purposes. As well as annual Masonic Balls, these included weekly dances, dance classes, public and group meetings, functions, parties, wedding receptions, sport and craft groups, church services, and funerals. The grounds have also been used for community markets. Visiting dignitaries also attended Masonic or non-Masonic events at the Masonic temple, including Queensland Governor Sir Leslie Wilson, in 1936, and Labor Premier Vincent Clair Gair, in 1952. In 2021, the ground floor is used for parties, Taekwondo lessons, and by Scottish dancers. The ground floor of the temple has also, in the past, been used by the now-defunct Ayr Order of the Eastern Star (a Masonic order open to both men and women), and in 2021 it is still used for meetings of the Home Hill Order of the Eastern Star, due to the closure of the Home Hill Masonic temple.

Few alterations have been made to the building since 1935. Additions were made to the rear service block to add toilets by 1958, most likely after the town's water supply and system was installed (post 1950), and storerooms in the late 1960s. Some of the windows of the lodge room were replaced with aluminium sliding windows in the 1990s, for improved ventilation. Prior to a sewerage system, the Masonic Temple probably had earth closets elsewhere on the site. A small building is located in the northeast corner of the allotment in the 1958 aerial photograph. A 1980 plan for an extension along the southwest side of the building did not occur.

In 2021, Ayr Masonic Temple is still used by Fuller 228. Ayr 211 (Ayr-Seaforth 211 from 1985) became defunct in 1997, and Delta 112 became defunct in mid-2021. The building remains highly intact and retains a considerable amount of early Masonic furniture and fittings.

== Description ==
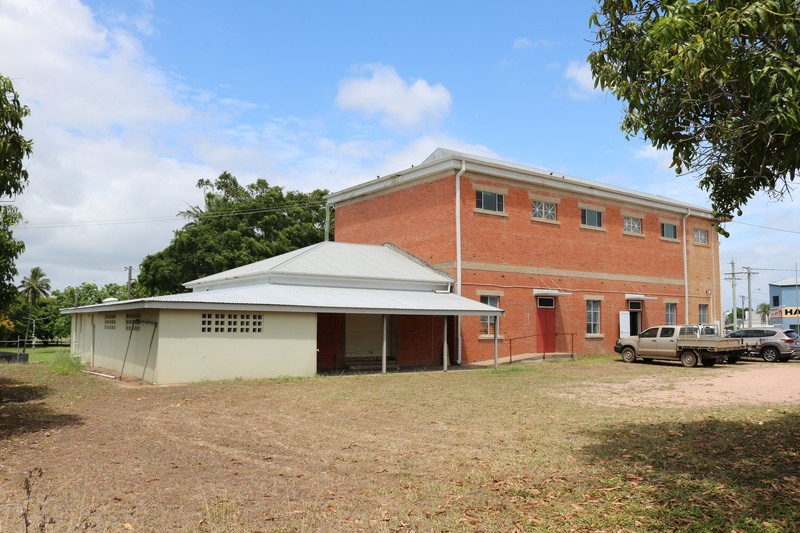
Side view showing rear service block with 1950s-60s extensions, 2021

Ayr Masonic Temple (1935) is a highly-intact, two-storey building located at the periphery of the central business district of Ayr. It occupies a rectangular corner site fronting north-west to Macmillan Street with Mackenzie Street on its southwest side. It is prominent within the immediate streetscape due to its height, corner location, and architectural style, and is also visible from the public parkland, Anzac Park, across Mackenzie Street. The building features many Masonic symbols integrated in the architectural details.

The building is rectangular with brick walls, timber-framed hip roofs clad with corrugated metal sheets, and a well-composed front elevation in cement render – a Neo-Classical temple-front in the Greek Doric order. The side and rear elevations feature fine face brick with regularly-spaced openings and cement render dressings. The blank rear wall is face brick and has an attached one-storey face brick service block.

The building stands back from its front boundary behind an original front fence and flat front garden of lawn with central concrete path to the front door. The ground floor accommodates a large Ballroom/Public Hall occupying the entire width and length of the main block. A connection at the rear of this room leads through to the Supper Room in the service block. A winding timber stair at the front of the Ballroom provides access to the first floor, which accommodates a landing area used as an Assembly Room with a changeroom, leading into a large private meeting hall (Lodge Room).

Concrete portal frames span the large ground floor Ballroom, and the first floor roof reportedly includes cast iron members (not sighted) to span the large first floor Lodge Room and support its domed ceiling. The service block has a concrete floor and timber-framed roof.

The openings of the first floor are smaller and have obscured glass, indicating the secrecy of the lodge meeting room within. Some openings of the Supper Room into the later extensions may be original.

The place retains original furniture, fixtures, and fittings including Masonic ceremonial furniture.

Features of Ayr Masonic Temple of heritage significance include:

- Ballroom
- Assembly Room
- Lodge Room
- Masonic fittings and furniture collection temporarily stored in 2021

== Heritage listing ==
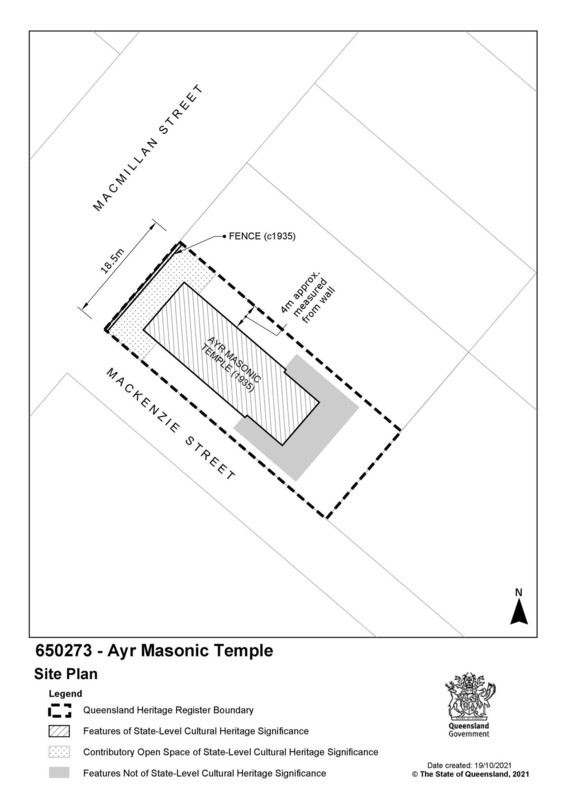
Site plan, 2021

Ayr Masonic Temple was listed on the Queensland Heritage Register on 25 February 2022 having satisfied the following criteria.

The place is important in demonstrating the evolution or pattern of Queensland's history.

Ayr Masonic Temple (1935) is important in demonstrating the development of Freemasonry in Queensland. An imposing two-storey brick building, its design and construction illustrates the growth and expansion of Freemasonry during the interwar period, reflected in the erection of more elaborate permanent Masonic temple buildings, following the formation of the United Grand Lodge of Queensland in 1921.

The place is important in demonstrating the principal characteristics of a particular class of cultural places.

In its form, fabric, layout, and furnishings, Ayr Masonic Temple is important in demonstrating the principal characteristics of a purpose-built Masonic temple in Queensland. Highly intact, these principal characteristics include its: high quality design and construction; impressive front elevation; Classical architectural details; privacy control measures and floor plan arrangement separating members and non-members; provision of lodge room with central open space with checkerboard "pavement", perimeter gallery of members' seats, elevated dais seats and lecterns for the Master and principal officers, and prominent use of the colour blue; and architectural and decorative features of Masonic allegorical and symbolic meanings.

The place is important because of its aesthetic significance.

Ayr Masonic Temple is important for its aesthetic significance as a highly intact masonry building in an impressive Interwar Classical style. It possesses beautiful attributes derived from its: well-composed and prominent temple-front; high-quality design and construction; symmetry, form, scale, materials, and decoration; and the integration of Masonic allegories and symbols into the design.
