= Mark Stoneman (politician) =

Australian politician

Mark Stoneman AM

Shadow Minister for Economic Development, Trade and Consumer Affairs
- In office 3 November 1992 – 31 May 1994
- Leader: Rob Borbidge
- Succeeded by: Tom Gilmore (Economic Development); Joan Sheldon (Trade and Consumer Affairs)

Shadow Minister for Employment and Industrial Relations
- In office 10 December 1991 – 3 November 1992
- Leader: Rob Borbidge
- Preceded by: Neville Harper
- Succeeded by: Santo Santoro

Shadow Minister for Regional Development
- In office 10 December 1991 – 3 November 1992
- Leader: Rob Borbidge
- Preceded by: Rob Borbidge
- Succeeded by: Mike Horan

Shadow Treasurer of Queensland
- In office December 1989 – 10 December 1991
- Leader: Russell Cooper
- Preceded by: Wayne Goss
- Succeeded by: Doug Slack

Minister for Primary Industries
- In office 25 September 1989 – 7 December 1989
- Premier: Russell Cooper
- Preceded by: Neville Harper
- Succeeded by: Ed Casey

Member of the Queensland Legislative Assembly for Burdekin
- In office 22 October 1983 – 13 June 1998
- Preceded by: Val Bird
- Succeeded by: Jeff Knuth

Personal details
- Born: Mark David Stoneman; 29 July 1939 (age 87) Wellington, New South Wales, Australia
- Party: National Party
- Spouse: Joan Elizabeth Ingrey
- Education: Hurlstone Agricultural High School
- Occupation: Grazier

Mark David Stoneman AM (born 29 July 1939) is a former Australian politician.

== Early life ==
He was born in Wellington, New South Wales, and was a grazier before entering politics.

== Political career ==
After moving to Queensland he was active in the National Party, and in 1983 was elected to the Queensland Legislative Assembly as the member for Burdekin.

In 1989 he was appointed Minister for Primary Industries, but later that year Labor won office.

In opposition Stoneman became Shadow Treasurer and Opposition Spokesman for Pastoral and Sugar Industries, moving to Employment, Regional Development and Industrial Relations in 1991 and to Economic Development, Trade and Consumer Affairs in 1992. He left the front bench in 1994, but when the Borbidge government came to power in 1996 he was appointed Parliamentary Secretary to the Premier and the government's North Queensland representative.

He retired in 1998.

== Personal life ==
He married Joan Elizabeth Ingrey on 3 March 1962, and they have 1 son and 3 daughters.

Parliament of Queensland
| Preceded by Val Bird | Member for Burdekin; 1983–1998 | Succeeded by Jeff Knuth |
