= Shadow Ministry of Campbell Newman =

Campbell Newman was elected Leader of the Liberal National Party of Queensland on 2 April 2011. Because he was not a Member of Parliament, he cannot be Leader of the Opposition. As a result, Jeff Seeney was chosen as the party's parliamentary leader and serves as Opposition Leader. On 11 April 2011, Newman announced his Shadow Cabinet.

== Shadow Ministry list ==
On 11 April 2011, Campbell Newman announced the following Shadow Ministry appointments:

Portfolio	Shadow Minister
Liberal of the Liberal National Party (Outside Parliament)	Campbell Newman
Leader of the Opposition; Leader of the Parliamentary Party; Shadow Minister for State Development; Shadow Minister for Infrastructure and Planning; Shadow Minister for Reconstruction	Jeff Seeney
Deputy Leader of the Opposition; Shadow Tresurer; Shadow Minister for Finance; Shadow Minister for Trade; Shadow Minister for Racing	Tim Nicholls
Shadow Minister for Transport; Shadow Minister for Multicultural Affairs; Shadow Minister for the Arts	Scott Emerson
Shadow Minister for Police, Corrective Services and Emergency Services	John-Paul Langbroek
Shadow Minister for Tourism, Manufacturing and Small Business	Jann Stuckey
Shadow Attorney-General	Jarrod Bleijie
Shadow Minister for Mining; Shadow Minister for Resources Management	Jack Dempsey
Shadow Minister for Education; Shadow Minister for Aboriginal and Torres Strait Islander Partnerships	Bruce Flegg
Shadow Minister for Health	Mark McArdle
Minister for Agriculture, Food and Regional Queensland	Andrew Cripps
Shadow Minister for Child Safety; Shadow Minister for Disabilities and Mental Health	Tracy Davis
Shadow Minister for Waste Watch; Shadow Minister for Community Services and Housing; Shadow Minister for Women	Fiona Simpson
Shadow Minister for Industrial Relations; Shadow Minister for Employment and Skills	Ted Malone
Shadow Minister for Local Government; Shadow Minister for Sport	David Gibson
Shadow Minister for the Environment	Andrew Powell
Shadow Minister for Government Services, Building Industry and Information and Communication Technology	Ros Bates
Shadow Minister for Energy and Water Utilities	Steve Dickson
Shadow Minister for Main Roads, Fisheries and Marine Infrastructure	Mark Robinson
Parliamentary Secretaries
Shadow Parliamentary Secretary for Northern Queensland; Leader of Opposition Business in the House	Rosemary Menkens
Shadow Parliamentary Secretary for Reconstruction	Peter Dowling
Shadow Parliamentary Secretary for Tourism	Glen Elmes
Shadow Parliamentary Secretary for Western Queensland	Vaughan Johnson
Shadow Parliamentary Secretary for Racing	Ray Stevens
Whips
Opposition Whip	Ian Rickuss
Deputy Opposition Whip	Ted Sorensen

== See also ==
- Opposition (Queensland)
- Bligh Ministry
- Newman Ministry
