= Val Bird =

Australian politician

The Honourable Val Bird

Member of the Queensland Legislative Assembly for Burdekin
- In office 17 May 1969 – 22 Oct 1983
- Preceded by: Arthur Coburn
- Succeeded by: Mark Stoneman

Personal details
- Born: Valmond James Bird; 14 May 1928 Ingham, Queensland, Australia
- Died: 19 August 2005 (aged 77) Gold Coast, Queensland, Australia
- Party: Country Party/National Party
- Spouse: Valma Jean Burns (m.1955 divorced 1998)
- Occupation: Company representative

Valmond James "Val" Bird (14 May 1928 – 19 August 2005) was a member of the Queensland Legislative Assembly.

== Biography ==
Bird was born at Ingham, Queensland, the son of Walter James Bird and his wife Ruth Elizabeth (née Thornton). He was educated at Ingham State School and after leaving he was a representative for the Golden Fleece Oil Company. He was also the secretary and industrial officer for the Ayr District Canegrowers Executive.

On 14 May 1955 Bird married Valma Jean Burns (divorced 1998) and together had three daughters. After he had serious fall in 2001 which left in a coma from which he was not expected to emerge, his daughters discovered they had another sister that Bird fathered in his teen years. He died in August 2005 on the Gold Coast.

== Public career ==
When the Independent politician Arthur Coburn retired at the 1969 Queensland state election, Bird took over as the member for Burdekin. He held the seat for 14 years before retiring in 1983.

Whilst in the Queensland Parliament Bird held the following roles.

- Minister for Education and Cultural Activities 1975–77
- Minister for Education 1977–80
- Delegate to the Commonwealth Constitutional Convention 1973
- Temporary chairman of Committees 1974
- Member of the Parliamentary Delegation to Pacific Area Travel Association Conference in Jakarta 1974
- Delegate to the Commonwealth Constitutional Convention 1975
- Delegate to the Commonwealth Constitutional Convention 1976
- Minister for Northern Development and Maritime Services 1980–82
- Minister for Northern Development and Aboriginal and Island Affairs 1982–83

Parliament of Queensland
Preceded by Arthur Coburn	Member for Burdekin; 1969–1983	Succeeded by Mark Stoneman
