= Steve Rodgers =

Australian politician

Member of the Queensland Legislative Assembly for Burdekin
- In office 17 February 2001 – 7 February 2004
- Preceded by: Jeff Knuth
- Succeeded by: Rosemary Menkens

Personal details
- Born: Steven Gordon Rodgers; 23 June 1951 (age 74) Lismore, New South Wales, Australia
- Party: Labor
- Occupation: Boilermaker, Carpet cleaner

Steven Gordon Rodgers (born 23 June 1951) is a former Australian politician. He was a Labor member of the Legislative Assembly of Queensland from 2001 to 2004, representing the seat of Burdekin.

== Biography ==
Rodgers was born in Lismore, New South Wales, and qualified as a boilermaker. He underwent national service from April 1972 to January 1973. In 1997 he was certified as a carpet cleaning technician by the Australian Carpet Cleaning Institute. Rodgers held the posts of President, Secretary and Treasurer of the Burdekin ALP branch before his election to the seat in a surprise win in 2001, pushing incumbent City Country Alliance member Jeff Knuth into third place. He was defeated by National Party candidate Rosemary Menkens in 2004. While he led on the first count, Menkens overtook him on preferences from Knuth, who ran as an independent. He tried to regain Burdekin in 2006 and was unsuccessful.

Parliament of Queensland
Preceded by Jeff Knuth	Member for Burdekin; 2001–2004	Succeeded by Rosemary Menkens
