= Dale Last =

Australian politician

The Honourable Dale Last MP
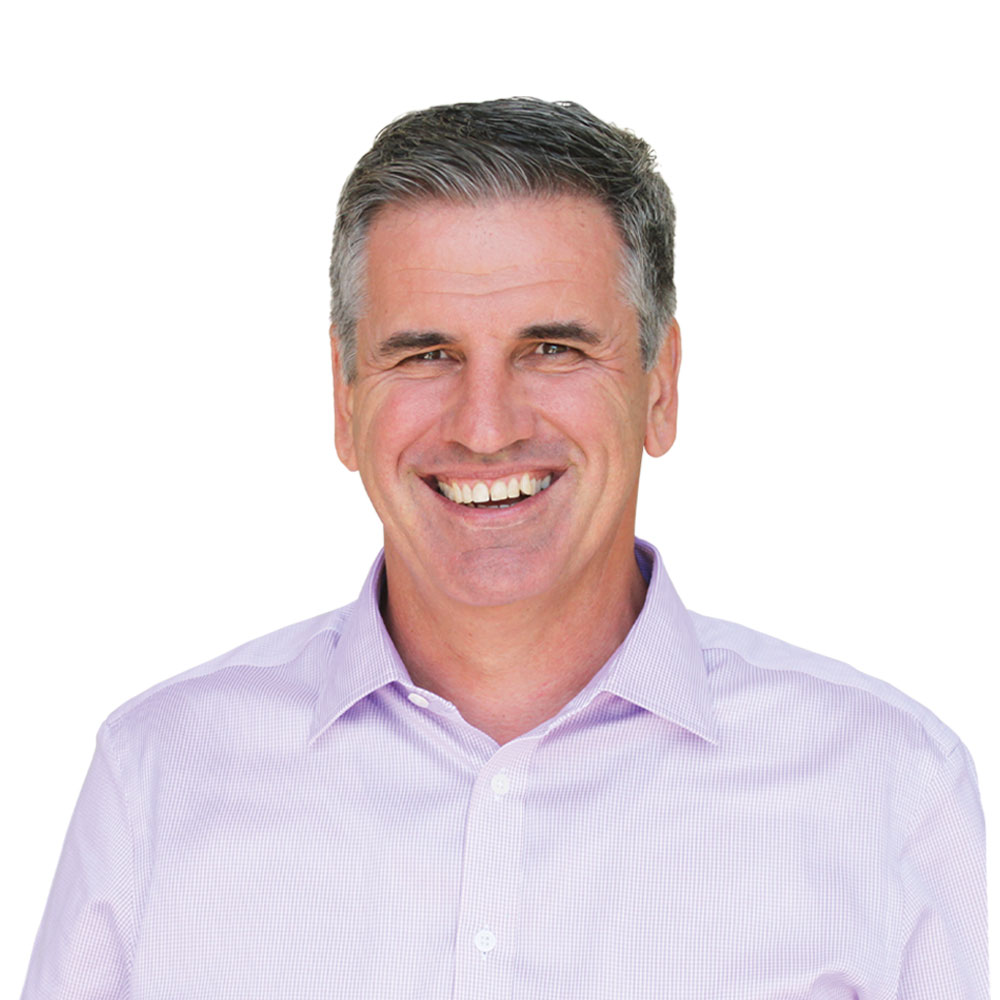

Minister for Natural Resources and Mines, Manufacturing, and for Regional and Rural Development
- Incumbent
- Assumed office 1 November 2024
- Leader: David Crisafulli
- Preceded by: Glenn Butcher (politician) (Rural Development and Manufacturing); Scott Stewart (politician) (Resources and Critical Minerals)

Shadow Minister for Police, Corrective Services, Fire and Emergency Services Shadow Minister for Rural and Regional Affairs
- In office 15 November 2020 – 28 October 2024
- Leader: David Crisafulli
- Preceded by: Dan Purdie (Police and Corrective Services); Lachlan Millar (Fire and Emergency Services)

Shadow Minister for Natural Resources and Mines Shadow Minister for Northern Queensland
- In office 15 December 2017 – 15 November 2020
- Leader: Deb Frecklington
- Preceded by: Andrew Cripps
- Succeeded by: Pat Weir

Shadow Minister for Agriculture, Fisheries and Forestry
- In office 6 May 2016 – 15 December 2017
- Leader: Tim Nicholls
- Preceded by: Deb Frecklington
- Succeeded by: Tony Perrett

Member of the Queensland Legislative Assembly for Burdekin
- Incumbent
- Assumed office 31 January 2015
- Preceded by: Rosemary Menkens

Personal details
- Born: 25 February 1964 (age 62) Bundaberg, Queensland
- Party: Liberal National Party
- Education: Central Queensland University
- Occupation: Police officer

Dale Raymond Last (born 25 February 1964) is an Australian politician. He has been the Liberal National member for Burdekin in the Queensland Legislative Assembly since 2015. He has been the Queensland Minister for Natural Resources and Mines, Manufacturing, and for Regional and Rural Development since 1 November 2024.

Before his election to state parliament, he was a councillor (even serving as Deputy Mayor) for the City of Townsville, and prior to that a police officer.

Dale has a Bachelor of Arts from Central Queensland University, and was the recipient of the National Police Medal in 1998.

Parliament of Queensland
Preceded by Rosemary Menkens	Member for Burdekin; 2015–present	Incumbent
