= Electoral district of Burdekin =

State electoral district of Queensland, Australia

Burdekin Queensland—Legislative Assembly
- Electoral map of Burdekin 2017
- State: Queensland
- MP: Dale Last
- Party: Liberal National
- Namesake: Burdekin River
- Electors: 34,920 (2020)
- Area: 78,681 km^{2} (30,378.9 sq mi)
- Demographic: Rural
- Coordinates: 20°26′S 147°30′E
Electorates around Burdekin:
Thuringowa; Mundingburra	Townsville	Coral Sea
Traeger	Burdekin	Whitsunday
Gregory	Gregory	Mirani

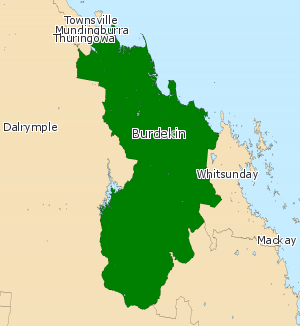
Electoral map of Burdekin 2008

Burdekin is an electoral district in the Legislative Assembly of Queensland in the state of Queensland, Australia. Centred on the Ayr–Home Hill region, the electorate also includes some of Townsville's southern semi-rural localities as well as the coal-mining towns of Collinsville, Moranbah and Clermont. The Burdekin River flows through part of the electorate.

== History ==
The 1949 redistribution abolished the electoral district of Bowen. Part of Bowen was combined with part of Mundingburra (which continued as an electorate, but more centred on Townsville) to create the new electoral district of Burdekin, centred on Ayr and Home Hill.

== Members for Burdekin ==
Member	Party	Term
Arthur Coburn	Independent	1950–1969
Val Bird	Country	1969–1974
Val Bird	National	1974–1983
Mark Stoneman	National	1983–1998
Jeff Knuth	One Nation	1998–1999
Jeff Knuth	Independent	1999
Jeff Knuth	New Country	1999–2000
Jeff Knuth	City Country Alliance	2000–2001
Steve Rodgers	Labor	2001–2004
Rosemary Menkens	National	2004–2008
Rosemary Menkens	Liberal National	2008–2015
Dale Last	Liberal National	2015–present

== Election results ==
2024 Queensland state election: Burdekin
Party	Candidate	Votes	%	±%
Liberal National	Dale Last	16,035	52.00	+12.30
Labor	Anne Baker	8,102	26.27	−5.43
Katter's Australian	Daniel Carroll	2,630	8.53	−5.67
One Nation	Andrew Elborne	2,342	7.59	+0.59
Family First	Amanda Nickson	922	2.99	+2.99
Greens	Ben Watkin	808	2.62	+0.62
Total formal votes		30,839	96.67	−0.04
Informal votes		1,061	3.33	+0.04
Turnout		31,900	87.55	−0.41
Two-party-preferred result
Liberal National	Dale Last	20,293	65.80	+8.75
Labor	Anne Baker	10,546	34.20	−8.75
Liberal National hold		Swing	+8.75	
