= Burdekin Shire Council Chambers =

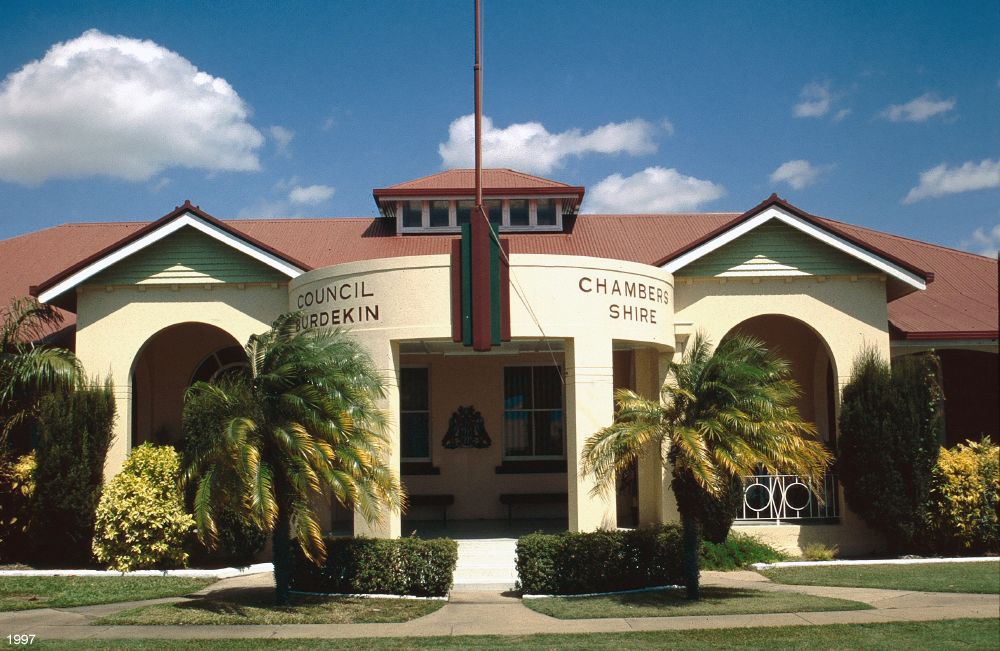
- Burdekin Shire Council Chambers

- Location within Queensland Location within Australia
- 19.5772°S 147.4062°E
- Location: 145 Young Street, Ayr, Shire of Burdekin, Queensland, Australia

History
- Design period: 1919–1930s (interwar period)
- Built: 1917–1939

Site notes
- Architect: Frederick Smith
- Architectural style: Classicism

Queensland Heritage Register
- Official name: Burdekin Shire Council Chambers, Ayr Shire Council Chambers
- Type: state heritage (built)
- Designated: 13 October 1997
- Reference no.: 601922
- Significant period: 1920s, 1982 (historical); 1920s–ongoing (social); 1920s–1930s (fabric)
- Significant components: council chamber/meeting room, office/s, views to, strong room, furniture/fittings
- Builders: AS Wight

Burdekin Shire Council Chambers is a heritage-listed town hall at 145 Young Street, Ayr, Shire of Burdekin, Queensland, Australia. It was designed by Frederick Smith and built in 1937 by local builder AS Wight. It is also known as Ayr Shire Council Chambers. It was added to the Queensland Heritage Register on 13 October 1997.

== History ==
Burdekin Shire Council Chambers at Ayr was completed in 1922 as Ayr Shire Council Chambers, replacing an 1890s timber building destroyed by fire in 1919. The 1922 building was designed by local architect Frederick Smith and extended in the late 1930s.

Ayr was established in 1882 to service the developing sugar-growing district on the Lower Burdekin River. In the early 1860s the land was taken up as pastoral runs, but during the second half of the 1860s and 1870s, following the introduction of the British Government's Sugar and Coffee Regulations of 1864, pastoral holdings on the Lower Burdekin gradually converted to sugar cultivation. By the late 1880s, four sugar mills had been established in the Burdekin.

When local government was extended to all Queenslanders in 1879, with the passing of the Divisional Boards Act 1879, the Lower Burdekin was included in Subdivision 3 of the Thuringowa Division, based in Townsville, while the area south of the Burdekin was included in the Wangaratta Division. The Lower Burdekin community became concerned that its problems were not being addressed by the Thuringowa Divisional Board, because board members from the district found it difficult to get to meetings in Townsville. An attempt to overcome these problems was made in September 1883 when the Lower Burdekin was included in Subdivision 2 and the remainder of the division within subdivision 1.

Despite these boundary alterations the problem of distance from Townsville could not be overcome so easily. A petition seeking to have the Lower Burdekin made a separate division was unsuccessful; despite support from the Thuringowa Board, the Minister for Lands rejected the petition. A further petition prepared in 1884, pointing out that the population of 2,000 people centred on Ayr, was not acknowledged. To maintain pressure on the government, residents formed the Burdekin Delta Association and a further petition was successful. The Ayr Division was proclaimed in 1888 but comprised only land north of the Burdekin River.

Board members were elected in 1888 and a reserve for a municipal chambers gazetted in April 1889, but lack of government funding combined with the devastating effects of the early 1890s depression, prohibited Ayr Divisional Board from erecting its own premises until 1895, when an office and board room were constructed. This building was damaged in 1903 by Cyclone Leonta, but was repaired.

Under the Local Authorities Act 1903 all divisions in the state became shires, and the Ayr Division became the Shire of Ayr.

In 1917 local architect Frederick Smith was engaged to design a strong room for safe storage of documents. Smith had been an articled pupil of the family firm of WG Smith and Sons, Architects in Townsville. He was employed by both the Queensland and Commonwealth Government as Clerk of Works, Ayr (1916–17) and District Supervisor, Ayr. His other buildings in Ayr included the Delta Theatre (1910) and the public hospital (1917).

A fire in 1919 destroyed the 1895 building, but not the strongroom. After the fire, council erected temporary offices next to the strong room and sought a loan to build substantial new brick chambers for the rapidly expanding shire. Frederick Smith prepared the plans and the tender of local builder AS Wight, for £2,824, was accepted. The foundation stone was laid by Queensland Governor Matthew Nathan on 25 July 1921 and the brick and concrete chambers measuring 16 by 10 metres (52 ft × 33 ft), with a surrounding 3 metres (9.8 ft) wide verandah, was completed early in 1922. These dimensions and early photographs suggest the building was symmetrical about the central hallway, with the meeting room to one side and two offices to the other, and an arched portico at the entrance. Apart from its role as Council Chambers, the meeting room has been used by many local groups including the local branch of the Queensland Country Women's Association and the Chamber of Commerce, and the cane-cutters sign-on in 1935. The 1917 strongroom appears to now form part of the rear verandah.

The sugar industry sustained the local economy during the 1930s depression, and the district expanded. Although plans for extensions to the Council Chambers, including a second storey and rear extension, were rejected as being too costly at £4000, ground floor extensions, at half the original projected cost, were completed in 1939. This extension appears included the present second entrance corridor and the wing of 4 offices to the southeast, and the consequent extension of the verandah and roof. The construction of the rooflight, the second arched portico reflecting the first, and the new curved entrance portico may also have been constructed at this time. The southwest verandahs were enclosed in the early 1970s to allow for more office space while those on the northeast side were enclosed at an earlier date.

Ayr's "twin town" of Home Hill was established by 1913 to promote development south of the Burdekin River. By the mid-20th century, the name of the Shire of Ayr was no longer considered representative of the whole of the local government area, and in 1946 the Home Hill Chamber of Commerce suggested the composite name Ayr-Home Hill Shire. The name was never adopted, but in 1976 the Council applied to become the Burdekin Shire. Although the Place Names Board pointed out that the Council district covered only part of the Burdekin, representations from local politicians over several years resulted in the new name Shire of Burdekin on 10 June 1982, Ayr's centenary year.

In 2016, the building continues to be the main venue for the council's meetings and its customer services.

== Description ==
The Burdekin Shire Council Chambers is a single-storeyed building located at the northern corner of a level block bound by Young, MacMillan and Wickham Streets, Ayr, addressing Young Street. The site is one block from the main street, Queen Street, which forms part of the Bruce Highway. Several church buildings and the Masonic Hall are located nearby along MacMillan Street.

The building is constructed of face brickwork with a hipped corrugated iron roof and encircling timber verandah. Centred on the ridge is a skylight.

The verandah is open on its two street elevations, with a concrete floor, dowelled balustrades and stop-chamfered posts. The south-eastern and south-western verandahs are enclosed and clad in chamferboards. At the rear is a brick safe with a steel door opening into the office.

The entry to the building is marked by a curved concrete portico, flanked by gabled pavilions with arched openings. The interior is divided into three by two parallel hallways. The two pairs of entry doors are aligned with the arched pavilions either side of the front portico.

The north-western end is the meeting room, with French doors opening onto the north-western verandah. It has a decorative cornice, and low-waisted four-panel doors with fretted toplights.

The central bays has two offices with moulded arched openings. The south-eastern end four offices opening from a central corridor.

The interior features rendered brick walls, high ceilings with decorative cornices, double-hung and leadlight windows and panelled doors with fretted toplights.

== Heritage listing ==
Burdekin Shire Council Chambers was listed on the Queensland Heritage Register on 13 October 1997 having satisfied the following criteria.

The place is important in demonstrating the evolution or pattern of Queensland's history.

The Burdekin Shire Council Chambers, erected in 1922 during a period of expansion in the sugar industry, demonstrates the role of the Shire Council in the development of Burdekin Shire as one of Queensland's most important sugar-producing districts. It is the earliest surviving Council building on the Council reserve, which once included the Shire Clerk's residence, stables and fire station.

The Burdekin Shire Chambers is close to other historic places including Anzac Park, Masonic Lodge, the former Presbyterian Church and an imposing house at 115 MacMillan Street, thus making a substantial contribution to the historic streetscape of the town.

The place is important because of its aesthetic significance.

Burdekin Shire Council Chambers is a substantial brick building occupying a prominent corner position, and makes an important aesthetic contribution to the Ayr townscape.

The place has a strong or special association with a particular community or cultural group for social, cultural or spiritual reasons.

The Burdekin Shire Council Chambers, an important example of the work of local architect Frederick Smith and local builder AS Wight, is valued by the community who expressed their concern in 1996 when the Council proposed alterations to the structure.
