= Jeff Knuth =

Australian politician

Leader of the Country Party Queensland
- In office 5 August 1999 – 2 May 2000; 7 February 2004 – 6 September 2008
- Deputy: Paddy Embry; Frank Hough
- Preceded by: Party established
- Succeeded by: Party merged; (New Country Party, One Nation Queensland)

Party Whip in the Queensland Legislative Assembly
- In office 23 June 1998 – 23 February 1999
- Leader: Bill Feldman
- Preceded by: Office established
- Succeeded by: Jack Paff

Member of the Queensland Legislative Assembly for Burdekin
- In office 13 June 1998 – 17 February 2001
- Preceded by: Mark Stoneman
- Succeeded by: Steve Rodgers

Personal details
- Born: Jeffrey Alan Knuth; 9 March 1962 (age 64) Ayr, Queensland, Australia
- Party: One Nation (1997–1999; 2014–2017)
- Other political affiliations: National (before 1997); Independent (1999; 2003–2004); Queensland Country (1999–2000); City Country Alliance (2000–2003); New Country (2004–2008); Liberal National (2008–2011); Katter's Australian (2011–2014)
- Relations: Shane Knuth (brother)
- Occupation: Painter and decorator (Self-employed)
- Profession: Tradesman; interior designer

Jeffrey Alan Knuth (born 9 March 1962) is an Australian politician.

== Biography ==
Born in Ayr, Queensland, he was a painter and decorator before entering politics. In 1998, he was elected to the Legislative Assembly of Queensland as a member of Pauline Hanson's One Nation, representing the seat of Burdekin. He was party whip and spokesperson for Public Works and Housing until 23 February 1999, when he resigned from the party to sit as an independent. On 5 August, he formed the Country Party Queensland (initially known as New Country Party QLD) as a splinter group from One Nation, but on 18 February 2000 joined the larger City Country Alliance, led by Bill Feldman. He was defeated by Labor's Steve Rodgers in 2001, and contested the seat in the 2004 state election as an independent with the support of federal independent MP Bob Katter. While he lost, his preferences were enough to help the Nationals' Rosemary Menkens defeat Rodgers. He later became aligned with the national New Country Party.

His brother, Shane Knuth, won the seat of Charters Towers for the National Party and later joined Katter's Australian Party with Jeff.

He rejoined One Nation in 2014. The following year, he contested the 2015 state election in the seat of Thuringowa as a One Nation candidate. He was unsuccessful in winning the seat, polling fourth with 7.4% of the vote.

Queensland Legislative Assembly
Election year	Electorate	Party	Votes	FP%	+/-	2PP%	+/-	Result
1998	Burdekin	ONP	7,657	33.10	▲33.10	59.40	▲59.40	First
2001	Burdekin	CCA	4,439	20.90	▲20.90	N/A	N/A	Third
2004	Burdekin	Ind	3,265	15.20	▲15.20	N/A	N/A	Third
2012	Hinchinbrook	KAP	9,564	35.24	▲35.24	46.37	▲46.37	Second
2015	Thuringowa	ONP	2,161	7.37	▲7.37	N/A	N/A	Fourth

Parliament of Queensland
Preceded by Mark Stoneman	Member for Burdekin; 1998–2001	Succeeded by Steve Rodgers
