= Arthur Coburn =

Australian politician

Member of the Queensland Legislative Assembly for Burdekin
- In office 29 April 1950 – 17 May 1969
- Preceded by: New seat
- Succeeded by: Val Bird

Personal details
- Born: Arthur Coburn; 13 July 1897 Ravenswood, Queensland, Australia
- Died: 29 August 1969 (aged 72) Ayr, Queensland, Australia
- Party: Independent
- Spouse: Mildred Gist (m.1926)
- Occupation: School Teacher

Arthur Coburn (13 July 1897 – 29 August 1969) was a member of the Queensland Legislative Assembly.

== Biography ==
Coburn was born in Ravenswood, Queensland, the son of William Coburn and his wife Sarah Ann (née Wood). After receiving his education at Ravenswood State School he embarked on a career as a school teacher which took him across Queensland as he was transferred between schools.

On 29 December 1926 Coburn married Mildred Gist (died 1985). Coburn died at Ayr in August 1969.

== Public career ==
After twice competing unsuccessfully for the seat of Mundingburra at the 1944 and 1947 state elections, Coburn won the new seat of Burdekin at the 1950 Queensland state election. He went on to represent the electorate for 19 years, retiring from parliament in 1969. For his entire time in state politics, Coburn sat as an independent.

Coburn was President of the Queensland Teachers Union (Lower Burdekin Branch), founder of the Methodist Eisteddfod Movement in 1931 and Chairman of the Ayr Hospital Board. He was also a Past Master of the Fuller Masonic Lodge, an Office bearer of the Manchester Unity Independent Order of Odd Fellows and a representative of the local Temperance League.

Parliament of Queensland
New seat	Member for Burdekin; 1950–1969	Succeeded by Val Bird
