= Rosemary Menkens =

Australian politician

Member of the Queensland Parliament for Burdekin
- In office 7 February 2004 – 31 January 2015
- Preceded by: Steve Rodgers
- Succeeded by: Dale Last

Personal details
- Born: 10 September 1946 (age 79) Collinsville, Queensland, Australia
- Party: Liberal National
- Occupation: Company director

Rosemary Norma Menkens (born 10 September 1946) is an Australian politician. She represented the electoral district of Burdekin in the Legislative Assembly of Queensland from 2004 to 2015. Originally elected in 2004 for the National Party, she joined the Liberal National Party in 2008. She was the Leader of Opposition Business in the Shadow Ministry of Campbell Newman. Menkens has previously held roles including Shadow Minister for Community Services and Housing and Shadow Minister for Women, Shadow Minister for Social Inclusion, Shadow Minister for Environment and Sustainability, Multiculturalism, Shadow Minister for Women, Shadow Minister for Northern Development and Shadow Minister for Child Safety, and Shadow Parliamentary Secretary for Costs of Living and is also the Shadow Parliamentary Secretary for Northern Queensland.

Parliament of Queensland
| Preceded by Steve Rodgers | Member for Burdekin; 2004–2015 | Succeeded by Dale Last |
