= Manbarra =

Aboriginal Australian people

Coordinates: 18°44′S 146°35′E

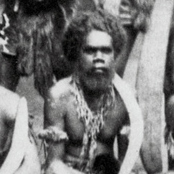
- Kukamunburra ("Tambo"), c. 1884

Regions with significant populations
- Traditional estate: Palm Islands and Halifax Bay; Contemporary populations: Great Palm Island, Townsville and Ingham

Languages
- Wulguru (dialects: Buluguyban, Mulgu)

Related ethnic groups
- Bwgcolman, Wulgurukaba, Nyawaygi

The Manbarra (also recorded as Manburra or Mun-ba-rah) are the Aboriginal Australian original owners of the Palm Island group and surrounding sea country in northern Queensland. Their traditional maritime and island estate covers approximately 5,498 square kilometres (2,123 sq mi), extending across the Palm Islands out to the 200-metre depth contour of the Great Barrier Reef.

== Name ==
The Manbarra are the original owners of the Palm Island group, known originally in the local language as Dhanu mira.

Morphologically, the name Manbarra is formed with the regional suffix -barra (or -bara), a common feature across central and eastern Queensland languages including Nyawaygi, Warrgamay, and Dyirbal signifying "belonging to", "people of", or "pertaining to" a specific geographic territory or ecological feature. Within this regional naming tradition, Manbarra designates the people belonging specifically to the Palm Island group.

== Language ==
The language spoken by the Manbarra was part of the Wulguru language group, which Robert M. W. Dixon classified alongside Nyawaygi as one of two Nyawaygic languages of the Herbert River region. Lexicostatistical analysis indicates a 58% lexical overlap between the Wulguru language complex and Nyawaygi, compared to 40% with Warungu and 28% with Biri.

Across the Palm Island group, two distinct dialects were traditionally spoken: Buluguyban and Mulgu. In comparative analysis, Buluguyban represents the most conservative branch of the language, retaining distinctive vocabulary (such as dhalmal for "water", compared to gamu in Mulgu and on the mainland) and preserving word-initial consonants that underwent initial-dropping in mainland dialects.

The surviving vocabulary of the Palm Island varieties was documented by Belgian anthropologists Émile Houzé and Victor Jacques, Ernest Gribble (1932), Peter Sutton (1970), and Tasaku Tsunoda (1974).

== Country ==
The traditional country of the Manbarra covers the Palm Islands and their surrounding waters in Halifax Bay, approximately 25 kilometres (16 mi) east of Ingham and 50 kilometres (31 mi) north of Townsville.

Within Manbarra lore, no distinction is drawn between the islands and the sea, which are regarded as one unified estate. Their combined land and sea estate spans roughly 5,498 square kilometres (2,123 sq mi), reaching out from the islands to the 200-metre depth line of the Great Barrier Reef.

The Palm Islands (Dhanu mira) includes Great Palm Island (Burrguman), as well as Fantome (Eumilli), Orpheus (Goolboddi), Curacoa (Noogoo), and Pelorus (Yanooa).

Archaeological digs show that Aboriginal people have lived on these islands and fished the reefs for at least 4,000 years. Culturally, the Manbarra are part of the broader Southern Rainforest (Girringun) group, sharing long-standing family and social ties with mainland neighbours around Townsville, Ingham, and the Herbert River region.

In the 20th century, anthropologist Norman Tindale grouped the Palm Islands into a wide mainland region of 1,000 square miles (2,600 km^{2}) under the name Wulgurukaba. However, historical and language studies show that the Palm Islanders maintained their own distinct island identity, separate sea country, and local dialects.

== Creation Stories ==
Within Manbarra cosmology, the physical landscape, islands, and surrounding marine reefs of Manbarra Country were shaped during the Creation era by ancestral beings who embedded customary law and the Manbarra language into the land and waters. The National Native Title Tribunal records that Manbarra title is spiritually anchored in three foundational creation accounts: an ancient Great Flood narrative first recorded by European observers in the late 1860s, the creative journeys of a giant ancestral Carpet Snake, and stories explaining the origin of specific sacred sites throughout the archipelago.

The giant ancestral Carpet Snake featuring in these foundational creation accounts for the Palm Islands themselves, is known in the Stories retellings as the Big Snake, Gabul (or Gubbal). In one account recorded in 1975 from Manbarra elder Reggie Palm Island (who learned the history from his father Dick and grandfather Mick) the Carpet Snake travelled south from northern country and moved through and created the Palm Island group. After a young girl was swallowed at a local lagoon, her father tracked the Big Snake past a hill on Great Palm Island and down Carpet Snake Creek to Cordelia Rock (the Little Carpet Snake), who revealed that the Big Carpet Snake had carried the girl across Halifax Bay to West Point on Magnetic Island. After the father retrieved and cleansed his daughter without harming the serpent, the Carpet Snake travelled onward toward the mainland, where its path entered and carved out the course of the Ross River

This creation Story has been corroborated in retellings preserved by subsequent generations of community elders, including Walter Palm Island, who emphasizes Gabul's role as the primordial Rainbow Serpent shaping the coastal topography and waterways between Ingham and Townsville One version of this creation story recorded in 1989 by anthropologist Nancy M. Williams, tells of the Big Snake travelling down the Herbert River and out into the sea, where his body broke apart; segments of his backbone forming the Palm Islands archipelago, while his head came to rest as Magnetic Island.

== Contact history ==
At the time of James Cook's passage through Halifax Bay aboard the Endeavour in June 1770, the Manbarra population has been estimated at approximately 200 people. During the late 19th century, the population declined severely due to violent incursions, abductions, and forced labour by European and Japanese pearling and bêche-de-mer crews operating in coastal waters.

Despite these disruptions, Manbarra families continued to live on Great Palm Island into the 20th century. Official inspections by the Queensland Chief Protector of Aborigines between 1907 and 1910 recorded a permanent camp living by hunting and fishing. On 14 June 1913, Manbarra resident Dick Palm Island formally wrote to the Inspector of Police in Townsville on behalf of "all the Natives of Palm Island", protesting non-Aboriginal encroachment on their living areas and the shooting of their hunting dogs.

In 1916, under the provisions of the Aboriginals Protection and Restriction of the Sale of Opium Act 1897, twenty-two Palm Island people were removed to the Hull River Aboriginal Settlement at Mission Beach on the mainland. Following the destruction of Hull River by the cyclone of 10 March 1918, surviving Palm Island residents were returned to the island alongside displaced mainland Aboriginal people to establish the Palm Island Aboriginal Settlement under Queensland State government control.

== Relationship to the Bwgcolman ==
Between 1918 and 1971, the Queensland Government forcibly transported at least 5,000 Aboriginal and Torres Strait Islander people from 43 distinct groups across Queensland, the Torres Strait, and Melanesia to the Palm Island Settlement. At first, the arriving groups lived in separate camps based on their home districts, such as the Babinda, Cooktown, and Gulf camps. Over time, the displaced people formed a shared community known as the Bwgcolman, the local Manbarra name for "Palm Island" (ie Burrguman)

Many of the people sent to the reserve in the early years came from inland or freshwater areas and had no experience with the sea. Manbarra elders, including Dick Palm Island, taught the arriving residents how to build canoes, fish the reefs, hunt turtle and dugong, and observe local maritime customs. Both groups came to rely on shared fishing grounds around Great Palm Island (Burrguman) and neighbouring islands such as Fantome Island (Eumilli) for reef fish, turtle, and traditional sea foods and medicines.

A clear distinction remains between the two groups in law and regional custom. The Manbarra are the direct descendants of the original inhabitants of the Palm Islands estate holding traditional ownership over both the islands and the sea. The Bwgcolman do not assert traditional ownership, but trace their connection to the island to the historical community formed under government resettlement.

While the Bwgcolman share in the Manbarra island and sea estate, community protocols maintain that they do not speak for the Manbarra, recognizing that the Manbarra alone hold the customary authority to speak for the country and grant permission for the use of its waters.

As of 2024, there is a Manbarra Elders Council overseeing a Palm Island (Burrguman) based ranger service called the Minggamingga Land and Sea Rangers monitoring the land and sea country surrounding the Palm Islands including rehabilitating native vegetation, managing feral animals, and carrying out customary "caring for country" priorities.

== Repatriation of Kukamunburra (Tambo) ==
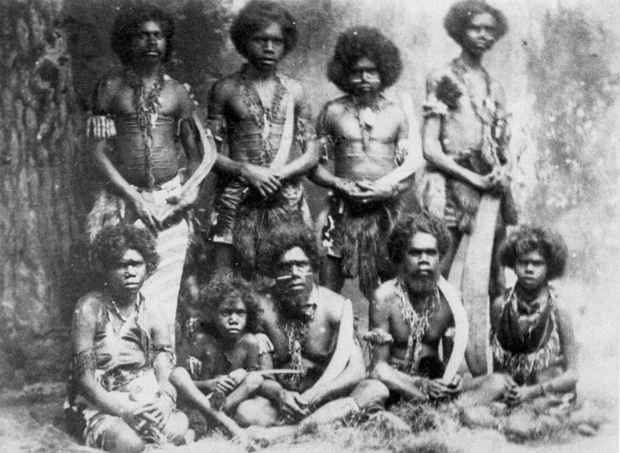
R. A. Cunningham's 1883–1884 touring troupe, which included Kukamunburra (back left) alongside Aboriginal performers from Hinchinbrook Island.

In 1883, during the early colonial period on Great Palm Island, a Manbarra man named Kukamunburra (known in historical accounts as "Tambo") was abducted by the showman Robert A. Cunningham to be exhibited in the United States as part of P. T. Barnum's travelling circus. He died in Ohio the following year. His mummified remains were displayed in a dime museum and later held in the basement of a Cleveland funeral home, where they were identified more than a century later.

Following appeals by the Manbarra community, his remains were repatriated to Palm Island in February 1994. His reburial according to traditional funeral customs played an important role in cultural renewal and the consolidation of identity for both the Manbarra and the broader Bwgcolman community.

== Native title and land tenure ==
Under Queensland land administration, reserve lands on Great Palm Island are held under a Deed of Grant in Trust (DOGIT) by the Palm Island Aboriginal Shire Council as trustee. In 2011, the Manbarra entered into a registered Indigenous Land Use Agreement (ILUA) with the shire council, formalizing traditional owner consent, consultation protocols, and land infrastructure planning.

On 14 March 2023, the National Native Title Tribunal accepted and registered the native title determination application for the Manbarra People (QC2022/003) over the land, surrounding waters, and reefs of the Palm Islands group. The claim area covers Great Palm Island, Fantome Island, Curacoa Island, Orpheus Island, Pelorus Island, Havannah Island, and adjacent islands and reefs, legally recognizing continuous customary connection and traditional ownership until such time as there is a Federal Court native title determination.

According to applicant spokesperson Walter Palm Island, the native title claim was made to seek formal co-management of the marine estate to regulate commercial fishing and protect the reef for future generations, rather than restricting general access. The native title application was formally supported by the Palm Island Aboriginal Shire Council, with Mayor Mislam Sam publicly affirming the council's backing and its close working relationship with the traditional owners.

== Sources ==
- Bates, Cameron (23 June 2023). "Massive NQ native-title claim met with 'concern'". Townsville Bulletin.
- Dixon, Robert M. W. (1983). "Nyawaygi". In R. M. W. Dixon and Barry J. Blake (ed.). Handbook of Australian Languages. Vol. 3. Amsterdam: John Benjamins. pp. 430–525. ISBN 978-90-272-2002-8.
- Dixon, Robert M. W. (2002). Australian Languages: Their Nature and Development. Vol. 1. Cambridge University Press. ISBN 978-0-521-47378-1.
- Donohue, Mark (2007). Wulguru: A Salvage Study of a North-Eastern Australian Language from Townsville. Languages of the World/Materials 463. München: Lincom Europa. ISBN 978-3-89586-327-1.
- Glowczewski, Barbara; Wotton, Lex (2008). Guerriers pour la paix: La révolte des Aborigènes d'Australie [Warriors for Peace: The Revolt of the Australian Aborigines] (in French). Paris: Indigène éditions. ISBN 978-2-911939-66-2.
- Healthy Waters Partnership (5 August 2021). Manbarra 30 Seconds (Video).
- Houzé, Émile; Jacques, Victor (1885). Étude d'anthropologie: les Australiens du Musée du Nord. Brussels: F. Hayez.
- Hubert, Jane; Fforde, Cressida (2005). "The reburial issue in the twenty first century". In Corsane, Gerard (ed.). Heritage, Museums and Galleries: An Introductory Reader. Psychology Press. pp. 107–122. ISBN 978-0-415-28945-0.
- The Manbarra People and Great Barrier Reef Marine Park Authority and Anor [2004] AATA 268 (15 March 2004), Administrative Appeals Tribunal
- NNTT (21 September 2022). "Schedule Extract attachment: QUD331/2022 (QC2022/003) Attachment C – Map" (PDF). National Native Title Tribunal.
- NNTT (14 March 2023). Extract from Schedule of Native Title Applications: QC2022/003 (PDF) (Report). National Native Title Tribunal.
- NNTT (14 March 2023). Registration Decision: Walter Palm Island & Ors on behalf of the Manbarra People v State of Queensland (Manbarra People) (QC2022/003 / QUD331/2022) (PDF) (Report). National Native Title Tribunal.
- "Palm Islands: Indigenous Land and Sea Rangers". Queensland Government. 7 November 2024.
- Poignant, Roslyn (2004). Professional Savages: Captive Lives and Western Spectacle. Yale University Press. ISBN 978-0-300-10247-5.
- Roginski, Alexandra (2015). The Hanged Man and the Body Thief: Finding Lives in a Museum Mystery. Monash University Publishing. ISBN 978-1-922-23566-4.
- St Joseph's Catholic School (The Strand) (2024). Gabul : big snake dreaming : a story from north Queensland. Townsville, Queensland: St Joseph's Catholic School, The Strand. NLA Bib ID: 10107437.
- Tindale, Norman Barnett (1974). "Wulgurukaba (QLD)". Aboriginal Tribes of Australia: Their Terrain, Environmental Controls, Distribution, Limits, and Proper Names. Australian National University Press.
- Watson, Joanne (1993). Becoming Bwgcolman: Exile and survival on Palm Island Reserve, 1918 to the present (PDF) (PhD thesis thesis). University of Queensland.
- Watson, Joanne (2010). Palm Island: Through a Long Lens. Aboriginal Studies Press. ISBN 978-0-85575-703-8.
