= Aboriginal Shire of Palm Island =

Coordinates: 18°44′12″S 146°34′53″E

- Local government area
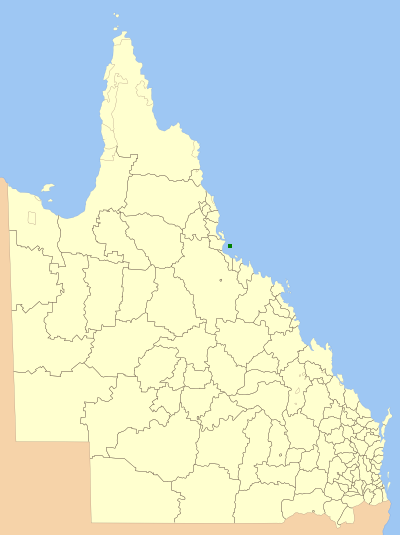
- Location within Queensland

- Interactive map of Aboriginal Shire of Palm Island
- Country: Australia
- State: Queensland
- Region: North Queensland
- Established: 1986
- Council seat: Palm Island

Government
  - Mayor: Alfred Lacey
  - State electorate: Townsville
  - Federal division: Herbert

Area
  - Total: 69.3 km^{2} (26.8 sq mi)

Population
  - Total: 2,098 (2021 census)
  - Density: 30.274/km^{2} (78.41/sq mi)
- Website: Aboriginal Shire of Palm Island
LGAs around Aboriginal Shire of Palm Island
| Coral Sea | Coral Sea | Coral Sea |
| Hinchinbrook | Aboriginal Shire of Palm Island | Coral Sea |
| Coral Sea | Coral Sea | Coral Sea |

The Aboriginal Shire of Palm Island is a special local government area of Queensland, Australia, managed by the Palm Island Aboriginal Shire Council under a Deed of Grant in Trust granted to the community on 27 October 1986. The local council was previously the Palm Island Community Council, which had far fewer powers. The shire is located on the Palm Island group, off the north Queensland coast near the city of Townsville.

Ten of the twelve Islands in the Greater Palm Island Group come under the control of the Shire – Palm Island, Fantome Island, Curacoa Island, Havannah Island, Brisk Island, Esk Island, Falcon Island, Eclipse Island, Barber Island, Fly Island – plus a few rocks (Dido Rock, Hayman Rock, Chilcott Rocks, Paluma Rock), but neither Orpheus Island nor Pelorus Island, are within its borders, and Albino Rock belongs to Orpheus Island National Park.

At the local government elections on 28 March 2020, a new mayor, Mislam Sam, was elected. He was succeeded by Alfred Lacey in the local government elections on 16 March 2024.

In the 2021 census, the Aboriginal Shire of Palm Island had a population of 2,098 people.

== History ==
=== The path to self-governance ===
After the Land Act (Aboriginal and Islander Land Grants) Amendment Act 1982 had established a system for granting a Deed of Grant in Trust (DOGIT) rather than land title to Indigenous councils, the Community Services (Aborigines) Act 1984 (Qld) was effected in order to transfer land currently under the administration of the Queensland Government to locally elected Aboriginal councils, giving Aboriginal councils powers and responsibilities similar to other local governments in Queensland.

On 30 March 1985, the Palm Island Aboriginal Council, with five councillors elected by the community, was established. Under the Aborigines and Torres Strait Islanders (Land Holding) Act 1985, Palm Island was among the first DOGITs received. It meant that the new autonomous Council would hold a perpetual lease over the former Aboriginal reserve lands on Great Palm Island and the ten surrounding islands of the group.

The council area was transferred on 27 October 1986 to the trusteeship of the council under a DOGIT.

Self-appointed "president" of Palm Island, Jeremy Geia, symbolically declared independence from Australia in 2001. The "Peoples Democratic Republic of Palm Island" was an expression of grievances against the Australian and Queensland Governments for neglect of Palm Islanders.

The Palm Island Council received qualified audits for the financial years 1999–2000, 2002–03 and 2003–04, and unqualified audits for 2000–01 and 2001–02. In October 2003 the council was dissolved and an administrator was appointed until the March 2004 election. This occurred due to a range of governance and financial management issues, including: insolvency, financial mismanagement, poor records and decision-making processes, and a failure to deliver major infrastructure projects. In addition, according to the Palm Island Select Committee, the local government elections of 1997, 2000, and 2004 demonstrated a lack of continuity in office-bearers, a relatively small number of voters combined with a large number of candidates, and a trend in some families for a number of relatives to stand for election.

Lex Wotton, who would later go on to lead the 2004 Palm Island riots, had resigned in June 2003 after becoming dissatisfied with the council's practices.

At the conclusion of the administrator's term, a handover report was presented to the newly elected Council, which included: allocation of specific portfolios for Councillors and the establishment of committee structures to ensure functional decision-making, appointment of a financial controller for 12 months and the engagement of a Human Resource Management consultant.

=== 2005: Council becomes a shire ===
On 1 January 2005, under the Local Government (Community Government Areas) Act 2004 (Qld) (the "CGA"), the Palm Island Aboriginal Council became the Palm Island Aboriginal Shire Council, on a par with other local councils in Queensland. This reconstitution into a Shire Council formed part of the Meeting Challenges, Making Choices strategy developed in response to the Cape York Justice Study undertaken by Justice Fitzgerald QC in November 2001.

Delena Foster became Mayor on 16 December 2006, taking over from Erykah Kyle. She had previously been chairwoman of the Community Council from 2001 to 2003, and had stood as an Independent candidate for the electoral district of Townsville in the 2004 election.

The structure of the Aboriginal Shire Council (or Community Council as it was previously) was criticised in the 2000 Dillon Report for the following reasons:

- Comparatively broad responsibility: it holds responsibility for policy portfolios which go far beyond what is expected of other Local Government Authorities, such as being the trustee of the DOGIT land, the provision of housing infrastructure, previously the running of the canteen and currently the running of the general store, law and justice, health, maintenance of culture and language, etc. The council is designed under the model of a mainstream Local Government Authority which structurally does not provide the latitude to address those functions which are not normally expected of mainstream Councils.
- Culturally inappropriate decision making: The Organisation is not designed to deal with cultural issues or complex social problems; the normal Indigenous decision-making processes and protocols such as consultation and input from family groupings are not structurally accommodated.
- Unrealistic local expectations: It is of concern that even greater expectations are put on the Community Council by their own constituents. The council is seen to have responsibility for all the community's needs and issues, ignoring the legislative limitations of the council, the complexity of issues impacting on the community, the impact of past and present governments' policies and the skill level of respective Councillors. This leads to Palm Island Councillors having far higher expectations put on them than mainstream Councillors and deflects responsibility away from Government Agencies, which could lead to Councillors considering that their role was a do 'what-ever' was required to meet the diverse needs of residents.
- Red tape: The council is overburdened with accountability and reporting requirements which detract from the role of consulting with constituents over their needs and aspirations and strategies to address them.

== Functions ==
The Shire's core business is the provision of housing. It conducted an audit of its houses and the people living in them in 2007, finding found that 120 new homes were needed. However, the Council primarily relies on income from rent and Government subsidies and can only afford to build one or two new houses a year.

== 2020 financial troubles ==
Before the March 2020 Council elections, two former council finance staff had charges of fraud laid against them by the Crime and Corruption Commission, and the state government brought in financial and governance advisers. In July 2020 it was found that the council had an operational deficit of about A$7 million out of a total budget of A$24.5 million. It was feared that plans for a new shopping precinct, due to deliver much-needed business and job opportunities, would be affected.

== Demographics ==
In the 2016 census, the Aboriginal Shire of Palm Island had a population of 2,446 people of whom 2,298 (94.1%) self-identified as an Indigenous person.

In the 2021 census, the Aboriginal Shire of Palm Island had a population of 2,098 people of whom 1,918 (94.1%) self-identified as an Indigenous person.

== Libraries ==
The Palm Island Shire Council operate the Bwgcolman Indigenous Knowledge Centre at 1 Main Street, Palm Island.

== Council ==
Palm Island Shire Council

Type
- Type: Unicameral

Leadership
- Mayor: Alfred Lacey, Independent
- Deputy Mayor: Mersane Oui, Independent

Structure
- Seats: 5 elected representatives, including a Mayor and 4 councillors
- Political groups: Majority: Independent (5)

Elections
- Last election: 16 March 2024
- Next election: 25 March 2028

The Palm Island Shire Council is a fully non-partisan council, with no elected councillors declaring membership of any political parties.

Below is the current council, elected in 2024:

| Name | Notes |
|---|---|
| Telstan Sibley | |
| Ebanese Oui | |
| Germaine Bulsey | |
| Mersane Oui | Deputy Mayor |
| Alfred Lacey | Mayor |

== Chairmen and mayors ==
- 2005 – December 2006: Erykah Kyle
- December 2006 – 2008: Delena Foster
- 2008 - April 2020: Alfred Lacey Snr
- April 2020 – April 2024: Mislam Zacchias Sam
- April 2024 - present: Alfred Lacey Snr
