= Eclipse Island =

Eclipse Island may refer to:

- Eclipse Island (Western Australia), a barren island near Albany in Western Australia
- Eclipse Island (Queensland), an island of the Great Palm Island group in Australia
- Eclipse Island (Newfoundland), an island near Burgeo in Newfoundland
