= Billy Doolan =

Australian Indigenous artist

Billy Doolan (Billy Doo)
- Born: Frederick William Doolan, Jr. 1952 (age 73–74); Palm Island Queensland. Language Group, Bwgcolman. Father, Wakka Wakka. Mother Tagalaka.
- Known for: Painter- acrylic on linen
- Notable work: Men Fishing; Two Sisters - How the Water Came; Swamp Frog Dreaming; Fish Spawning

Frederick William Doolan, Jr. (born 1952), also known as Billy Doo, is an Australian Indigenous artist who lives in Townsville, Queensland but has done of his artwork in Melbourne, Victoria.

He was featured in two 2011-2012 exhibitions, a one-man show titled "Between Sky and Sea" at the Italian Institute of Culture in Melbourne which ran from 28 October 2010 to 20 April 2012 and a major show which exhibited in Italy from 11 February 2011 to 28 August 2011 titled "Dreamtime Lo Spirito Dell'Arte Aborigena". It was held at MAN Museum, Nuoro, Sardinia and final attendance figures were 25,000. In addition some 2000 school children ranging from late primary school level to early secondary attended classes at the Museum to be taught some basic elements of Australian Aboriginal art and culture. Almost 90 Aboriginal artists from all over Australia were featured and over 350 items were exhibited making it the largest public showing of its type to be shown overseas. Twenty two of Billys' pieces were chosen for the exhibition which made him the largest single contributor. Curators in Australia were Maree Clarke from the Koori Heritage Trust, Amanda Reynolds from Stella Stories and Giovanna Gotti, the senior curator for the Egyptian Art Museum in Turin.

In 2016 Billy was invited to be the artist in residence at the Hong Kong Institute of Education. During his residency he taught students on his art practice, highlighting the uniqueness of First Nations art in North Queensland.

The HKIE is a UNESCO school and the artist was a guest of honour at an international symposium which was held during his stay there. He completed a suite of large scale paintings based on his travels in Hong Kong.

== Early life ==
Doolan's mother came from the town of Gulf of Carpentaria (Grandmother came from Croydon, Queensland), and his father, for whom he is named, from Central Queensland, Australia.

Doolan was born in 1952 on Palm Island, Queensland which was the site of a penal settlement from 1918 and is one of the largest Aboriginal communities in Australia with Indigenous people making up 96.6% of the population (ABS, 2006). Bwgcolman is the name given to Aboriginals resettled on Palm Island but the young Doolan lived only a few years on the island before his family was evicted to the Australian mainland.

Billy's father Frederick William, was a ringleader in the 1957 Palm Island Labourer's Strike. This political activity resulted in the family being removed from Palm Island to Townsville on the mainland coast where they settled in Happy Valley.

== Career ==
The Dictionary of Australian Artists Online states that Doolan's works were showcased in 2001 exhibition "Gatherings", Contemporary Aboriginal and Torres Strait Islander Art from Queensland, Australia and that Doolan works are in synthetic polymer on linen. The exhibition was held at the Brisbane Convention and Exhibition Centre. The book launched at the show and carrying the same title was written by Marion Demozay and published by Keearia Press.

"Gatherings 11" again featured Doolans' works and was shown at the Queensland Art Gallery in 2006. The accompanying book of the same title was launched at the opening night. Author was Marion Demozay and publisher Keearia Press.

In 2009 the artist was a finalist in the 2009 Victorian Aboriginal Art Awards held at Boscia Gallery, Melbourne. The exhibition was supported by the Victorian Government and accompanied by a booklet featuring Billy's work.

The "Dreamtime Lo Spirito Dell'Arte Aborigena" Catalogue published in February 2011 is an Italian edition and supports the travelling exhibition of the same title. 22 of Billys' pieces are featured in the exhibition and illustrated in the catalogue. Contributing authors are Maree Clarke, senior curator at The Koorie Heritage Trust, Amanda Reynolds, Dr Davide Sandrini, Giovanna Gotti, senior curator of the Turin Egyptian Museum and Hans Sip.

The Italian Institute of Culture in Melbourne held Billy Doolan's first major solo public exhibition titled Between Sea and Sky: Songs of a Voyage in 2010 with the paintings '...the result of a cultural exchange project initiated by Melbourne-based Sicilian-born arts promoter Maria Sanciolo-Bell'. All eight of Doolan's Sicilian themed paintings included in the IAI were painted between the George Wright Aboriginal Hostel in Melbourne and his Townsville home. The works presented various set of challenges for the artist who gained his inspiration from his trip to Sicily in 2009. He intended to provide an account of Sicilian history and culture that adhered to specific standards of representation. The work required over a year to finish.

The remaining seven works in the show were contributed by Hans Sip of Aboriginal Exhibitions Pty Ltd who is the artist's representative. The Sicilian project led to the biggest non-commercial travelling exhibition of indigenous artwork to leave Australia as of 2011 initially titled "The Rainbow Serpent" and later renamed Dreamtime. Doolan was one of 90 artists included in the $3 million exhibition and is its greatest contributor with 22 pieces out of the total of over 350 exhibits. More than 280 items were donated to the show by Hans Sip with the remainder donated by Adam Williams, another major private collector and 9 individual artists.

The "Between and Sky" exhibition toured 4 cities in Sicily in 2012 and is scheduled to tour a further 4 cities in Sicily in 2013.

In 2013 Billy was requested by the directors of the Mt Etna Association to prepare a statement relating to his visit to Etna and what it meant to him. One of the paintings in the "Between Sea and Sky" exhibition is of Mt Etna and this image together with his statement formed part of the Association's bid for the World Heritage listing of Mt Etna. UNESCO formally announced the listing of MT Etna in June 2013.

A didgeridoo painted by Billy which was previously exhibited in Italy was presented to the UNESCO office in Rome and is now part of its collection and on public display there.

On 24 February 2014 the artist received a formal invitation from the Head of the Department of Cultural and Creative Arts, Faculty of Liberal Arts and Social Sciences at The Hong Kong Institute of Education, Professor Samuel Leong to accept a residency. He will be in Hong Kong from 23 April 2014 to 24 May 2014 and during the visit Billy will be involved in the following activities:-Participation in the UNESCO International Arts Education Week events. Academic and student presentations discussing topic areas around art, heritage, indigenous culture and stories. Workshops in painting style. Cultural exchanges with Hong Kong academics, educators and artists. Completion of nine paintings by November 2014 offering Doolan's impressions of Hong Kong with the objective of converging Chinese and Aboriginal cultures. The artist will draw on his own Chinese heritage through his great grand father Sam Wing. Mr Wing came to the Croydon goldfields in Northern Queensland in the late nineteenth century to seek his fortune and settled, married Billy's great grandmother and raised a family.

The artist collaborated with Amanda Feher to produce two metal sculptures titled "Canoe People" and "Gabul Creation Story" for the Jezzine Barracks redevelopment in Townsville. The official public opening was the fourth of April 2014.

Creative Cowboy Films produced a thirty-minute blog on the artist's visit to Hong Kong which was released on the eighteenth of April 2014.

On the second of May 2014 the first two paintings of the Hong Kong series were revealed by Prof. Samuel Leong and the artist titled "Nine Dragons of Kowloon" and "Cranes"

An article titled "A Mighty Heart Billy Doolan" was published by Essentials Magazine in their Autumn 2011 issue (no.20). It featured three of the paintings which were touring Italy at the time.

Italianicious Magazine published an article titled "Impressions of Sicily" in their November–December 2011 issue featuring works hanging at the "Between Sea and Sky" exhibition at the Italian Institute of Culture.

== See also ==
- Art of Australia
