= Trial of Lex Wotton =

2007 Australian trial

The trial of Lex Wotton relates to the events surrounding the Townsville, Queensland proceedings in the Federal Magistrates Court concerning the actions taken by Palm Island Aboriginal Shire Council member Wotton during the 26 November 2004 Palm Island riots.

Wotton was a two-time councillor on the Palm Island Aboriginal Shire Council when Cameron Doomadgee died in custody. Wotton led approximately 1,000 people in the Palm Island Riots. Wotton was arrested, but on his release, he was hailed as a hero by many residents of Palm Island. He continued to act as a leader and even ran for mayor of the North Queensland Aboriginal community. Approximately four years after the riot, Wotton was found guilty of inciting a riot and sentenced to seven years in prison. He later successfully sued the Queensland Police Service for unlawful racial discrimination.

== Lex Wotton ==
Lex Wotton
- Born: Lex Patrick Wotton; 1967 or 1968 (age 58–59); Palm Island, Queensland, Australia
- Occupations: Plumber; Politician; Activist
- Criminal charges: 1986: Domestic violence; 2008: Inciting a riot
- Criminal penalty: 1986: Four months imprisonment; 2008: Six years imprisonment
- Criminal status: Sentences served; ex-offender
- Spouse: Cecilia Ann Wotton
- Children: 4

Member of the Aboriginal Shire of Palm Island
- In office c. 1997 – June 2003

Personal details
- Party: Independent

Lex Patrick Wotton (born 1967 or 1968) was a plumber by trade and the plumber for Palm Island as well as an Aboriginal elder, an Indigenous activist of prominence and co-author. He also married and is the father of four children.

In October 2002, at age 34, Wotton was elected to his second term as councilor on the Palm Island Aboriginal Shire Council in an ATSIC Regional Council elections where he was one of eight nominations seeking two positions. In May 2003, Wotton supported a group of Palm Island women who called for the resignation of council chairwoman Delena Foster, asserting that she "diminished the rights of all islanders by proposing a strict new alcohol ban" as well as threatening a significant source of income for the area. Eleven days later, Wotton stated that the council had only A$600,000 left in its reserves to run the island until the end of June – a claim chairwoman Foster heatedly disputed by saying that the council in fact had A$1.5 million. By the end of June, Wotton became fed up with the Palm Island Aboriginal Council's practices and handed in his resignation, reasoning that in the 3 1/2 years he was on the council, the body did not achieve one long-term success.

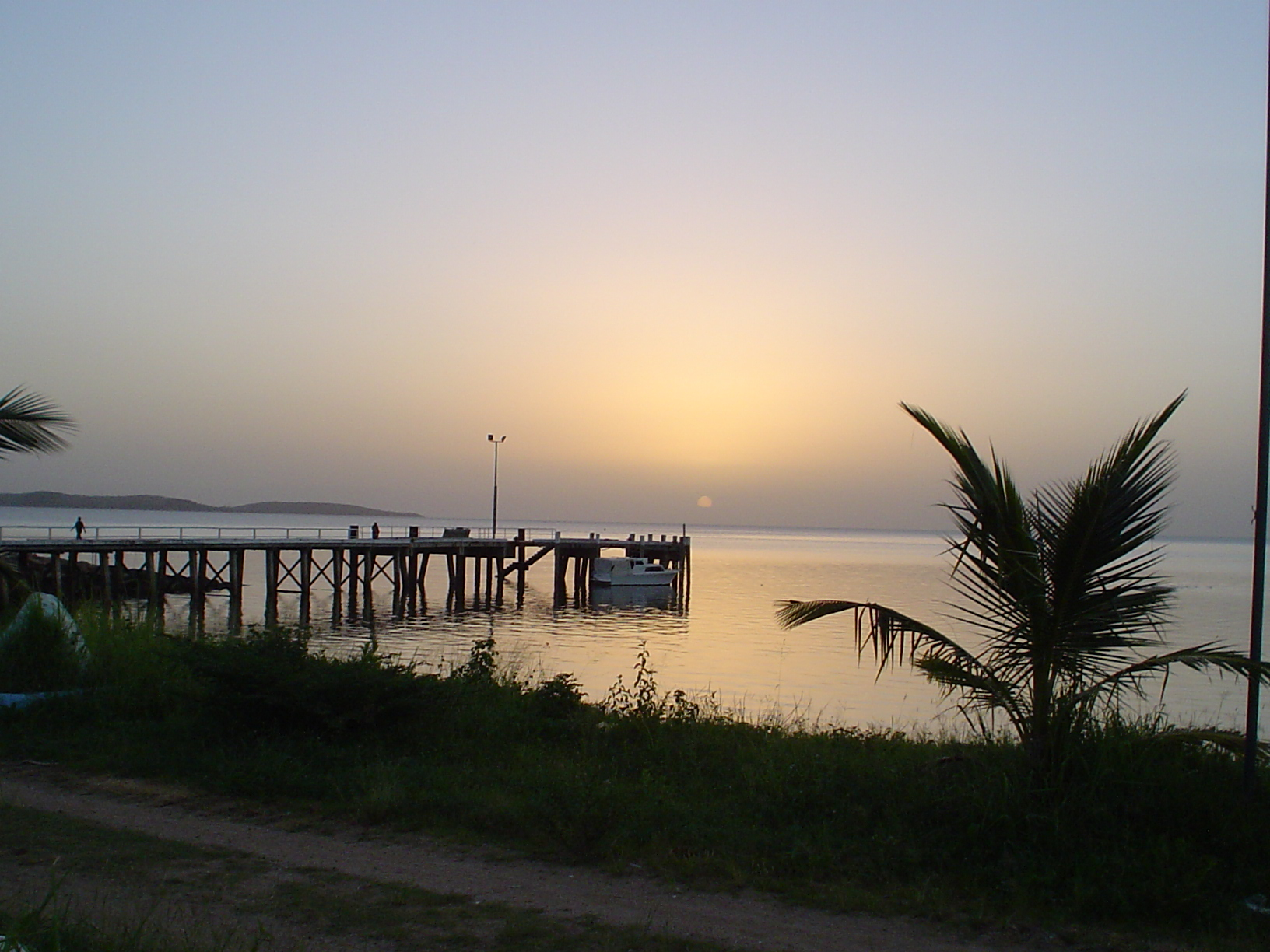
Palm Island Jetty

Wotton, a plumber by trade, then kept his name in the public by writing to Letters to the Editor of the Townsville Bulletin to get his messages out. For example, in November 2003, Wotton's letter to the editor praised the decision to dissolve the Palm Island Aboriginal Council, since it would allow Palm Island "to adopt the very principles and practice of good governance and to see it effectively and efficiently discharged for the benefit of all in our community." In March 2004, he wrote an open letter to the recently reelected official Mike Reynolds, requesting an explanation as to why the jetty at Arcadia Bay received part of a massive injection of state money whereas no state funds were allocated for the dilapidated Palm Island jetty, even though 86 per cent of the Palm Island vote went to Reynolds. At the end of March, Wotton was one of eight candidates for the new Palm Island Community Council.

=== Public speaking ===
Wotton had become something of a public speaker, speaking at various venues including presenting the screening of Protected at the Film Fanatics society at Petersham Bowling Club where he spoke of seeing the film as a boy and how it opened his eyes to the way "things were different on Palm". He went on a tour that included Melbourne on 9 August 2008 at the Solidarity Fiesta at the MUA Auditorium he said .... "I'm not afraid of anything, because...people like you will get out there and spread the message, tell the truth." On 10 September 2008 he spoke at a public meeting at the Queensland University of Technology.

== Book release ==
Along with French ethnographer Barbara Glowczewski, Wotton is co-author of the 2008 book Warriors for Peace: The Political Conditions of Aboriginal People as Viewed from Palm Island. (Glowczewski has also written Angry dreams – Aboriginal alliances in the North-West of Australia and Desert dreamers – the Warlpiri people of Australia.)

== The Palm Island riots ==
On Friday 19 November 2004, 36-year-old Palm Island resident Cameron Doomadgee was arrested for public drunkenness and died in police custody an hour later. The coroner's report was released on Friday 26 November, and read to a community meeting. After hearing that Doomadgee had died from a ruptured liver in the scuffle at the island's watch-house, a succession of angry young Aboriginal men spoke to the crowd and encouraged immediate action be taken against the police. Doomadgee's death was repeatedly branded "cold-blooded murder". Wotton joined 1,000 other people in a riot on Palm Island that resulted in the police station, the court house, and the home of the officer-in-charge being burned down. In a Friday interview with The Courier-Mail, Wotton justified the riot, saying that the residents did not believe the death was an accident and the residents had set fire to the police station because they had been "crying out for help" and no one had listened. Additionally, Wotton sought an investigation by the Crime and Misconduct Commission (CMC) and wanted the government to agree to move all police from the island.

Before his Courier-Mail newspaper interview was delivered to the public and in response to Wotton's actions during the riot, police entered Wotton's home at 4:45 am Saturday and used a stun gun on the back of his leg to arrest him, all the time pointing a rifle at his 15-year-old daughter's head as she sat on a bedroom floor. At the time, Wotton became one of 17 defendants, all males, charged in the Palm Island riots and was alleged to be the riot ringleader. At the Townsville Magistrate Court on 29 November, Wotton was charged with "arson (two counts), serious assault on police (three counts), wilful damage and riot causing damage".

=== Out on bail ===
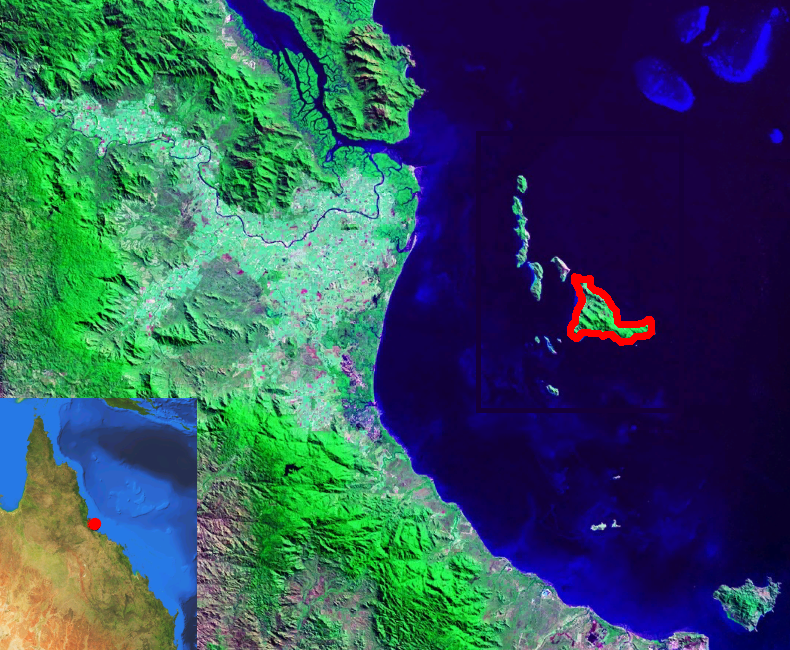
Wotton was prevented from returning to his home on Palm Island (outlined in red) for five months after the 2004 riots.

On 6 December, Wotton was released on bail, in part due to being characterised as a "leader and saviour" for the Palm Island community. The bail conditions required Wotton to return to court on 10 March 2007, and restricted Wotton's movements, particularly focusing on preventing his attending Doomadgee's funeral and returning to the north Queensland island.

Despite the strict bail conditions, three days later Wotton attended a protest march through Townsville and laid flowers on the steps of the north Queensland city's police station in memory of Doomadgee. Wotton was being hailed a hero even before Doomadgee's sister put her arms around Wotton's neck on 9 December, saying "you're my warrior". After a subsequent court hearing, Wotton was allowed to return home to Palm Island in early May 2005.

In November 2006, four months before his trial where he faced life imprisonment, Wotton become one of six people nominated to run for mayor of the North Queensland Aboriginal community in a December by-election. However, one day before the election, the Supreme Court of Queensland ruled Wotton ineligible to be mayor since the Local Government Act 1993 disqualifies people from elected office in Queensland if they are an undischarged bankrupt and Wotton had previously been bankrupt.

== The trial ==
In February 2007, Wotton was granted a separate trial from his co-accused in the Brisbane District Court since the allegations in the prosecution case against the other co-accused were prejudicial to Wotton's case. Wotton then pleaded guilty to the charge of rioting. In late March, after Wotton had already applied to withdraw his guilty plea on the advice of his legal representatives (including his then barrister Marcus Einfeld), Wotton's co-accused were acquitted by a jury of rioting causing destruction. Wotton's application to withdraw his plea was granted by Nase DCJ on 26 April 2007. A few days later, Wotton was released on bail with strict conditions and ordered to return in April 2008 to be tried.

As Wotton waited for his trial, a man mistaken for being Wotton in September 2007 was attacked from behind while at a urinal in the Rising Sun Hotel. In addition to having his wrist bone shattered and jaw bone fractured, the attackers caused him internal bleeding, head and facial injuries and bruised ribs.

After several delays, Wotton's trial began on 6 October 2008 in the District Court in Brisbane. The trial lasted 18 days, with the jury on 24 October finding Wotton guilty of inciting a riot that resulted in the destruction of the island's police station, the courthouse and an officer's residence. Fourteen days later, Wotton was sentenced to seven years in prison, reduced to six years for time already served. His family has no plans to appeal the sentence.

=== Protest against Wotton's charge and sentencing ===
On 1 November 2009 about 250 protesters in Brisbane who expressed anger at Wotton's sentencing. The same week, similar rallies took place in major Australian cities and in Wellington, New Zealand. MUA workers in Sydney observed one minute's silence in solidarity. Speakers at a Brisbane rally argued that Wotton should have been given a bravery award for what they saw as standing up to the racist oppression of Palm Islanders. Benefit concerts were also held in support of him.

== Release from prison ==
On 19 July 2010 after spending two years in prison, Wotton was released from a Townsville prison and placed on parole. There are strict conditions surrounding his release. He was to return to Palm Island at the end of the week but was to first have some minor medical treatment.

== Gag order and High Court appeal ==
Wotton v Queensland
- Court: High Court of Australia
- Decided: 2 February 2012
- Citations: [2012] HCA 2, (2012) 246 CLR 1
- Transcripts: 23 Mar [2011] HCATrans 70; 16 May [2011] HCATrans 136; 2 Aug [2011] HCATrans 189; 3 Aug [2011] HCATrans 191

Court membership
- Judges sitting: French CJ, Gummow, Hayne, Heydon, Crennan, Kiefel and Bell JJ

Since 2006, all prisoners and parolees in Queensland have been prohibited by law (section 132 of Queensland's Corrective Services Act, introduced by the Beattie Labor Government) from speaking to reporters without permission. Thus, for the duration of his imprisonment and parole, Wotton could not lawfully speak to the media or attend public meetings without prior approval from his parole officer. Gracelyn Smallwood of the Indigenous Human Rights Committee believed it was designed to muzzle the truth. Terry O'Gorman, President of the Australian Council for Civil Liberties, has called it 'obnoxious'. Stewart Levitt, the director of the Black and White Justice Foundation remarked that it was unusual for a public spokesman and former politician to be prohibited from a public meeting. Welcoming Wotton back home, Alf Lacey, mayor of Palm Island, commented that the conditions were excessive.

Wotton contested the constitutionality of Queensland's parole conditions to the High Court of Australia. The Australian constitution contains an implied freedom of political communication, as is necessary in a representative democracy, plus rights to freedom of association and assembly. The case was heard by the High Court in August 2010, where Wotton was represented by a team of lawyers including Levitt Robinson Solicitors, Ron Merkel QC, assisted by Kristen Walker, Alistair Pound and Ben Schokman.

In February 2012 the High Court by majority decision, supported the gag order. The majority judgement applied the test in Lange v Australian Broadcasting Corporation. That,

First, does the law effectively burden freedom of communication about government or political matters ... ? Second, if the law effectively burdens that freedom, is the law reasonably appropriate and adapted to serve a legitimate end the fulfilment of which is compatible with ... responsible government?

and found that, while the legislation did burden Mr Wotton's freedom of political communication, that burden was applied for a legitimate ends, namely maintenance of law and order.

== Racial discrimination class action ==
Wotton v Queensland (No 5)
- Court: Federal Court of Australia
- Decided: 5 December 2016
- Citations: [2016] FCA 1457, (2016) 352 ALR 146

Court membership
- Judge sitting: Mortimer J

In 2013, Lex Wotton, as well as his wife Cecilia and mother Agnes, filed a class action lawsuit on behalf of Aboriginal people who lived on Palm Island against the State of Queensland and the Commissioner of the Police Service, alleging that the police had committed acts of unlawful racial discrimination in the investigation into Mulrunji's death in custody and in the subsequent police response to the unrest in the community. The Wottons' legal team included Lex Wotton's long-standing lawyer, Stewart Levitt of law firm Levitt Robinson Solicitors, as well as prominent anti-discrimination barrister Chris Ronalds SC, Aboriginal barrister Joshua Creamer, and Queensland barrister Shaneen Pointing.

The initial trial of the claims of Lex, Agnes and Cecilia Wotton, and the issues common to their claims and the claims of the class members was heard in Townsville over a total of 22 days, between September 2015 and May 2016. On 5 December 2016, Justice Mortimer handed down a 1,806 paragraph judgment, declaring that:

″1. In relation to the applicants and group members as defined in the further amended originating application filed 25 August 2015, Detective Inspector Warren Webber, Detective Senior Sergeant Raymond Joseph Kitching and Inspector Mark Williams committed unlawful discrimination, in contravention of section 9(1) of the Racial Discrimination Act 1975 (Cth), by failing to treat Senior Sergeant Christopher Hurley as a suspect in the death of Cameron Doomadgee and by allowing Senior Sergeant Hurley to continue to perform policing duties on Palm Island between 19 and 22 November 2004.

2. In relation to the applicants and group members, between 19 and 22 November 2004, Detective Inspector Webber and Detective Senior Sergeant Kitching committed unlawful discrimination, in contravention of section 9(1) of the Racial Discrimination Act, in their treatment of Aboriginal witnesses interviewed, and in their treatment of information supplied by those witnesses, for the purposes of the investigation by the Queensland Police Service into the death of Cameron Doomadgee.

3. In relation to the applicants and group members, between 19 and 22 November 2004, Detective Senior Sergeant Kitching committed unlawful discrimination, in contravention of section 9(1) of the Racial Discrimination Act, in submitting inaccurate information to the coroner, and in failing to supply relevant information to the coroner, for the purposes of the coronial investigation into the death of Cameron Doomadgee.

4. In relation to the applicants and group members, the failure of any officer of the Queensland Police Service with appropriate command responsibilities, including Inspector Gregory Strohfeldt and Acting Assistant Commissioner Roy Wall, to suspend Senior Sergeant Hurley from active duty on Palm Island after the death of Cameron Doomadgee on 19 November 2004 constituted unlawful discrimination in contravention of section 9(1) of the Racial Discrimination Act.

5. In relation to the applicants and group members, the failure of any officer of the Queensland Police Service with appropriate command responsibilities on Palm Island between 22 and 26 November 2004, including Inspector Brian Richardson and Senior Sergeant Roger Whyte, to communicate effectively with the Palm Island community and defuse tensions within that community relating to the death in custody of Cameroon Doomadgee, and the subsequent police investigation, constituted unlawful discrimination in contravention of section 9(1) of the Racial Discrimination Act.

6. In relation to the applicants and group members, Detective Inspector Webber, in making at 1.45 pm on 26 November 2004 and continuing until 8.10 am on 28 November 2004 a declaration of an emergency situation under section 5 of the Public Safety Preservation Act 1986 (Qld) engaged in unlawful discrimination in contravention of section 9(1) of the Racial Discrimination Act.

7. In using officers of the Special Emergency Response Team to carry out the arrest of the first applicant on 27 November 2004, officers of the Queensland Police Service with command responsibilities for the police operations on Palm Island at that time, including Detective Inspector Webber, Inspector Steven Underwood and Inspector Glenn Kachel, engaged in unlawful discrimination in contravention of section 9(1) of the Racial Discrimination Act.

8. In using officers of the Special Emergency Response Team on 27 November 2004 to carry out the entry and search of the house of the first and third applicants, officers of the Queensland Police Service with command responsibilities for the police operations on Palm Island at that time, including Detective Inspector Webber, Inspector Underwood and Inspector Kachel, engaged in unlawful discrimination contrary to section 9(1) of the Racial Discrimination Act.

9. In using officers of the Special Emergency Response Team on 27 November 2004 to carry out the entry and search of the house of the second applicant, officers of the Queensland Police Service with command responsibilities for the police operations on Palm Island at that time, including Detective Inspector Webber, Inspector Underwood and Inspector Kachel, engaged in unlawful discrimination contrary to section 9(1) of the Racial Discrimination Act.

10. Pursuant to section 18A of the Racial Discrimination Act, the Racial Discrimination Act applies in relation to the first respondent as if the first respondent had engaged in the conduct of the officers of the Queensland Police Service referred to in paragraphs 1 to 9 above, and the first respondent is taken to have contravened section 9(1) of the Racial Discrimination Act in the manner there set out.″

Justice Mortimer also ordered that the State of Queensland pay $95,000 in compensation to Lex Wotton, $10,000 to Agnes Wotton, and $115,000 to Cecilia Wotton. According to the Wottons' legal team, the judgment left the door open for potentially hundreds of claims for compensation by Aboriginal residents of Palm Island who were affected by the police conduct.

In May 2018, the 447 members of the community involved in the class action were granted a A$30 million dollar settlement and an apology by the Queensland Government.
