= Brisk Island =

Island in Queensland, Australia

Brisk Island (Culgarool)
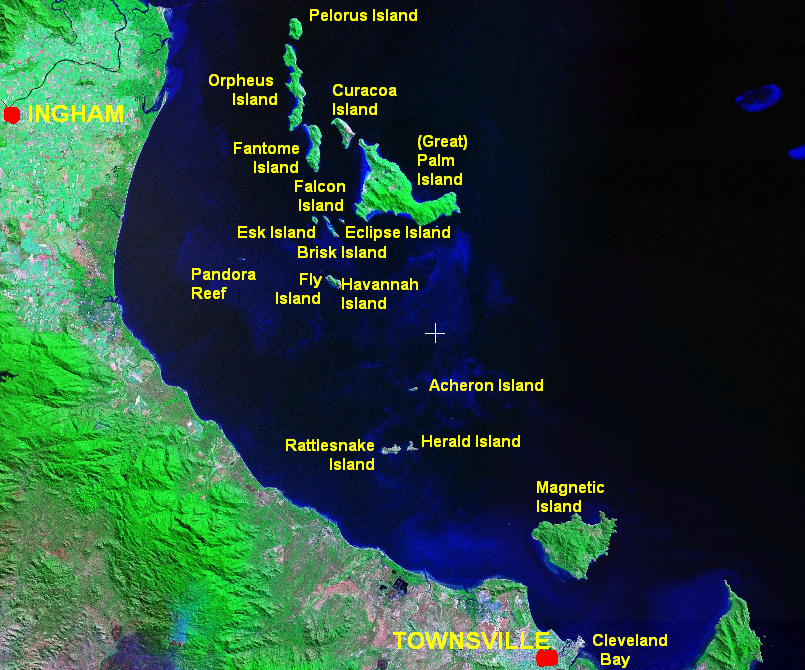
- Brisk Island and surrounds

Geography
- Location: Northern Australia
- Coordinates: 18°47′02″S 146°32′31″E
- Archipelago: Great Palm Island group
- Area: 0.51 km^{2} (0.20 sq mi)

Administration
- Australia
- State: Queensland
- LGA: Palm Island Aboriginal Shire Council

Brisk Island is an island in Australia's Great Palm Island group. The nearest island is Great Palm Island, after which the group is named. The Nyawaygi name for Brisk Island is Culgarool. Along with nine of the other islands within the Palm Islands group, it falls under the local government area of the Aboriginal Shire of Palm Island.

The island was gazetted as an Aboriginal reserve on 20 September 1941, along with neighbouring small islands, with the intention of extending Palm Island Aboriginal Settlement, but it was never used as such.

The island is situated in Steamer Passage, Halifax Bay approximately 2 kilometres (1.2 mi) southwest of Palm Island in Queensland, Australia. It is around 51 hectares or 0.51 square km in size.

There is no naturally occurring fresh water on Havannah, Fly or Brisk Islands.

== See also ==
- List of islands of Queensland
