= Palm Island Aboriginal Settlement =

Australian Aboriginal reserve (1914–1975) in Queensland

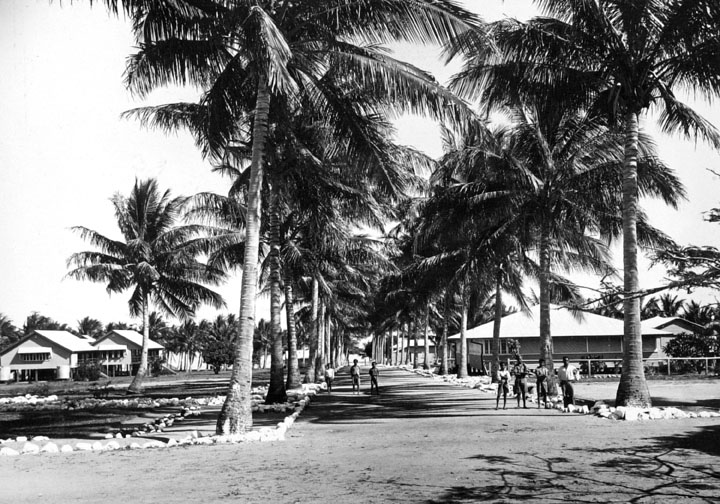
Palm Island showing guest house and school c. 1935

Palm Island Aboriginal Settlement, later officially known as Director of Native Affairs Office, Palm Island and also known as Palm Island Aboriginal Reserve, Palm Island mission and Palm Island Dormitory, was an Aboriginal reserve and penal settlement on Great Palm Island, the main island in the Palm Island group in North Queensland, Australia. It was the largest and most punitive reserve in Queensland.

Gazetted in 1914, the first residents were only moved there in March 1918 from the Hull River Aboriginal Settlement after that reserve was destroyed by a cyclone. The settlement continued under government control in various forms until 1975. Palm Island was mentioned in the Bringing Them Home Report as an institution that housed children removed from their families, part of the Stolen Generation.

== Background ==
In 1909 the Chief Protector of Aborigines visited the island, apparently to check on the activities of Japanese pearling crews in the area, and reported the existence of a small camp of Aboriginal people. In 1916 he found Palm Island to be "the ideal place for a delightful holiday' and that its remoteness also made it suitable for use as a penitentiary" for "individuals we desire to punish".

== 1914/1918: Establishment ==
In 1914 the Government established the Hull River Aboriginal Settlement on the Hull River near Mission Beach on the Australian mainland. On 10 March 1918, the structures were destroyed by a cyclone and were never rebuilt.

Palm Island Aboriginal Settlement had been gazetted as an Aboriginal reserve on 20 June 1914, although at the time there were few Aboriginal people living on Great Palm. Its size was about 15,000 acres (6,100 ha). After the cyclone had demolished Hull River, around 1 April 1918 the settlement relocated to Palm Island, with the new population from various Aboriginal peoples – from at least 57 different language groups throughout Queensland – later referred to as the Bwgcolman people.

The Superintendent of Palm Island Aboriginal Settlement was directly responsible to the Chief Protector of Aboriginals, who in turn was responsible to the Home Secretary's Office (after 5 December 1935, the Department of Health and Home Affairs). The Aboriginal residents were deemed wards of the state, with every aspect of their lives controlled by this office.

== 1920s–1930s: Missionaries, school and dormitories ==
A number of missionaries from various Christian denominations visited or settled and worked on the island. In the 1920s, two female Baptist missionaries began some work on the reserve, and Catholic priests visited between 1918 and 1924. In 1930, Father Paddy Molony began his work, and the Sisters of Our Lady Help of Christians occupied the convent built in 1934. A Catholic school was built in 1937.

In March 1921 Great Palm Island and Eclipse Island were gazetted as Aboriginal Reserves.

In 1922–3 an Industrial School (under the Industrial and Reformatory Schools Act 1865) and segregated dormitories for the children were established. On arrival, children were separated from their parents and then segregated by sex. The dormitories operated as care for orphans or neglected children, but also places of detention for single mothers and their children.

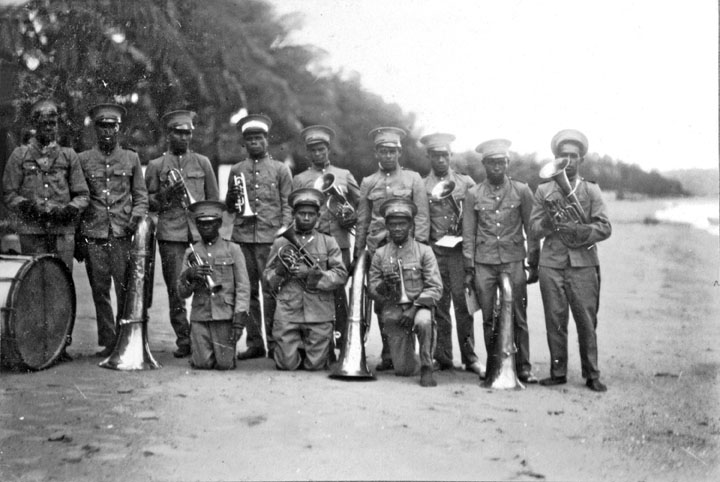
Brass Band, June 1931

== 1930: Superintendent murders ==
On 3 February 1930, in an incident known as the 1930 Palm Island Tragedy, the first Superintendent of the Settlement, Robert Henry Curry, who had been a strict disciplinarian, shot and wounded two people, and set fire to several buildings, killing his two children. Later in the day, the Superintendent was shot dead. An official inquiry by the Queensland Attorney General followed. Those involved in the shooting of the Superintendent, including the Deputy Superintendent and the Palm Island Medical Officer, were charged with murder. During the trial the Crown Prosecutor was directed by the trial judge to drop the charges, stating that the shooting was justified.

== 1938/1941: Re-gazetting ==
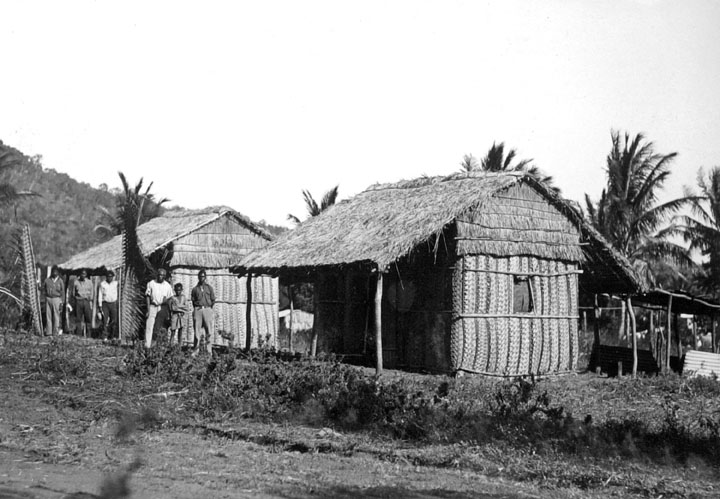
Huts built from palm leaves and roofed with grass

Palm Island was re-gazetted as an Aboriginal reserve on 16 July 1938, and on 20 September 1941 some of the small islands surrounding Great Palm, including Curacoa Island, Falcon Island, Esk Island, Brisk Island, and Havannah Island, were also gazetted as reserves, under Chief Protector John William Bleakley, who targeted them as sites for further institutions for punishing people. There is no record of dwellings or other structures being built on these islands, but Eclipse Island had become known as "Punishment Island" under Curry. Curry, as punishment for misdemeanours such as speaking their own language or gambling, was to exile men to Eclipse Island, and sometimes Curacoa, with only bread and water, sometimes for weeks at a time.

South Australian anthropologist Norman Tindale visited the island in 1938, and recorded the genealogies of people representing a large number of tribal groups from across mainland Queensland.

== 1939: Director of Native Affairs Office, Palm Island ==
After 12 Oct 1939, when the Aboriginals Preservation and Protection Act 1939 and Torres Strait Islander Act 1939 were passed, the name changed from Palm Island Aboriginal Settlement to Director of Native Affairs Office, Palm Island. The Act effected a change in policy: instead of protection and segregation of Indigenous people, it instead focussed on assimilation into the "white community". It gave freedom and full citizenship rights to Aboriginal who qualified for these, but also streamlined the administration and development of Aboriginal reserves.

On a surprise inspection of the Palm Island Prison during an official visit in the late 1960s, Senator Jim Keeffe and academic Henry Reynolds discovered two 12- to 13‑year‑old schoolgirls incarcerated in the settlement's prison by the senior administrator on the island (the superintendent), because "they swore at the teacher".

== Life on the reserve ==
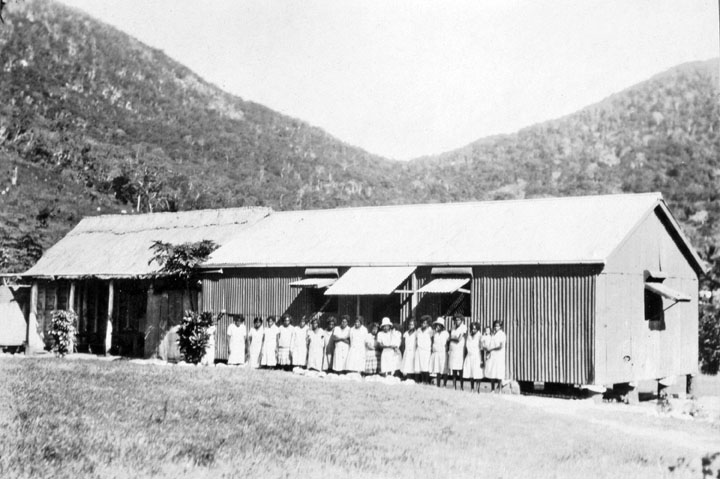
Girls' dormitory, June 1931

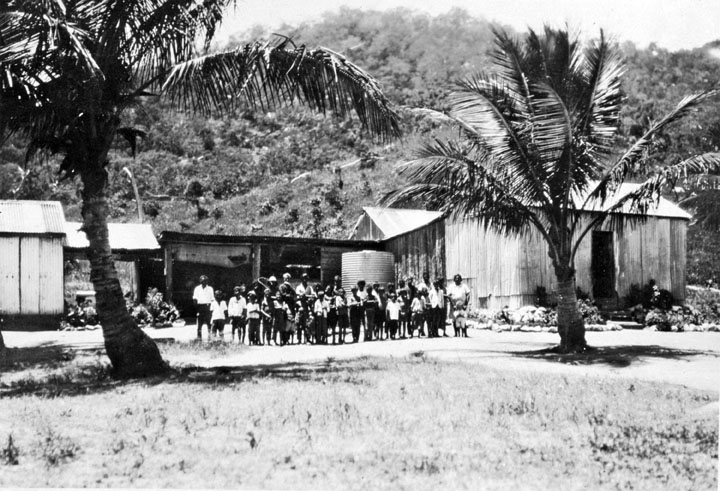
Boys dormitory, June 1931

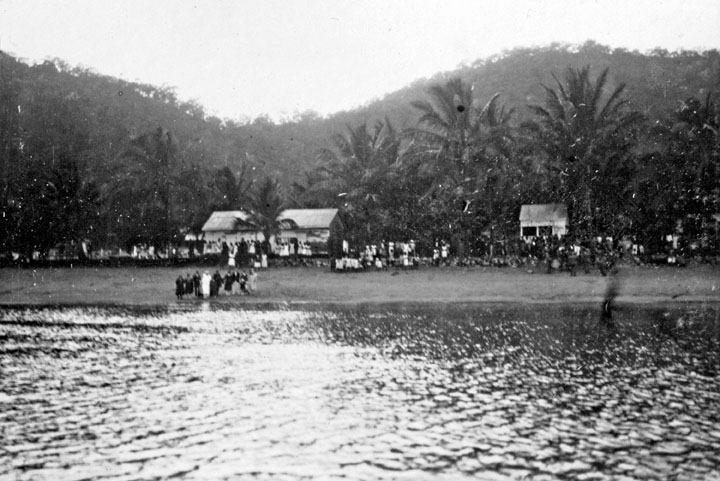
Residents of Palm Island, June 1931

In the first two decades of its establishment the population of Indigenous "inmates" increased from 200 to 1,630. In 1939 there were 1248. By the early 1920s, Palm Island had become the largest of the government Aboriginal settlements. Administrators found its location attractive as Aboriginal people could be isolated, but Palm Island quickly gained a reputation amongst Aboriginal people as a penal settlement. They were removed from across Queensland as punishment; being "disruptive", falling pregnant to a white man, or being born with "mixed blood" were among the "infringements" that could lead to the penalty of being sent to Palm Island. New arrivals came after being sentenced by a court or released from prison, or they were sent by administrators of other missions wishing to weed out their more ill-mannered or disruptive Aboriginal people. The death rate on the reserve was higher than the birth rate until after 1945, with replenishment of numbers from the mainland the only reason for the growth in population there.

Palm Island was used as a penal institution for Indigenous people who ran afoul of the 1897 Protection Act, as well as those who had committed criminal offences. Many men who had already served their time in jail on the mainland were afterwards moved to the reserve, thus punishing them a second time for the same offence.

In the 1930s a local doctor highlighted malnutrition on the island, and demanded that the Government triple rations for the islanders and that children be provided with fruit juice, but the request was denied.

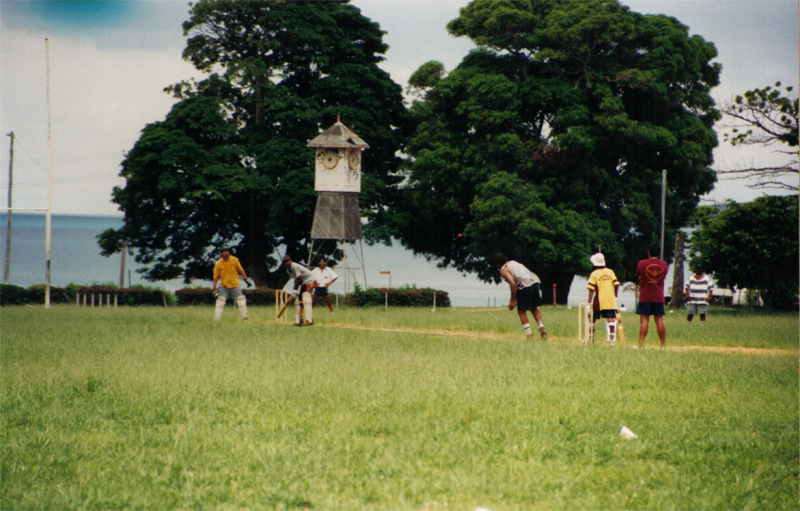
Locals playing cricket with the bell tower in the background (1996)

On the reserve there was a "hospital, two schools, a Female Welfare Organisation with a Home Training Centre, an Old People's Home, a Child Welfare Centre with baby and child clinics, dormitories for children, women and youths, churches of various denominations, a curio shop, sawmill and logging operations, and a workshop where training was undertaken in carpentry, joining and plumbing".

A bell tower was built to dictate the running of the mission. The bell would ring each morning at eight, a signal for everyone to line up for parade in the mission square. Those who failed to line up had their food allocation cut. At nine each evening the bell would ring again, signalling the shutting down of the island's electricity. The roll call and curfew lasted until the 1970s. The bell tower still stands in the local square to this day, a relic of Palm Island's history. It was recorded that there was almost military-like discipline in the segregation between white and black, and that inmates "were treated as rather dull retarded children".

The following letter was written to a new bride by the "Protector":

"Dear Lucy, Your letter gave me quite a shock, fancy you wanting to draw four pounds to buy a brooch, ring, bangle, work basket, tea set, etc, etc. I am quite sure Mrs. Henry would expend the money carefully for you, but I must tell you that no Aborigine can draw 4/5 of their wages unless they are sick and in hospital and require the money to buy comforts... However, as it is Christmas I will let you have 1/5 – out of your banking account to buy lollies with."

Aboriginal people were forbidden to speak their language and to go into "white" zones. Everyday activity was highly controlled by administrators, and there were nightly curfews and the vetting of mail. In some cases, women were put into dormitories and their husbands sent to work on the mainland.

=== 1957: Strike ===
One of the harshest Superintendents was Roy Bartlam, who arrested workers for being a minute behind the roll call in the reserve.

All Islanders were required to work 30 hours each week, and up until the 1960s no wages were paid for this work. The catalyst for the strike was the attempted deportation of Indigenous inmate Albie Geia who committed the offence of disobeying the European overseer. The strike was also against the harsh conditions imposed by Bartlam, low or no wages, as well as poor housing and rations. Bartlam was forced to flee to his office and call for reinforcements. Armed Police arrived by RAAF launch from Townsville, and the "ringleaders" and their families were deported in chains to other Aboriginal settlements.

Seven families were banished from the Palm Island in 1957 for taking part in a strike organised to protest against the Dickensian working conditions imposed by the Queensland Government under the reserve system. Athlete Cathy Freeman's mother, Cecilia Barber, and the family of strike ringleader Frederick William Doolan including Billy Doolan Jnr. were among those banished from the island.

== 1960s–1975 ==
New dormitories for boys and girls were constructed in 1962 and 1965 respectively. By 1966, there were about 71 children housed in them.

The Director of Native Affairs Office was superseded by the Aboriginal and Island Affairs Department on 28 April 1966, after being abolished by the Aboriginal and Torres Strait Islanders Affairs Act 1965. The functions were transferred to the Aboriginal and Island Affairs Department, District Office, Palm Island.

The women's dormitory closed in 1967 and demolished two years later.

In this period, most of the children were being sent by the Children's Services Department. As ideas about the care of young people changed, fewer children were sent to Palm Island, and by 1975 there were only 27 children left in the dormitories. They were closed completely on 5 December 1975.

== Legacy ==
=== Descendants ===
Today's population are descendants of people taken to the reserve from 1914 up to 1971. Estimates vary, but the number of tribal groups represented by the descendants (known as the Bwgcolman people is at least 43 and has been said to represent 57 different language groups. At least 5000 people were forcibly removed to the reserve from all over Queensland, the Torres Strait and Melanesian islands. The majority of the current population descend from peoples occupying the region between Bowen and Tully, from north-western Queensland, and from the Cape York Peninsula.

=== Social issues ===
The "largest and historically most punitive of Queensland's Aboriginal reserves", Palm Island was mentioned in the Bringing Them Home Report (1997) as an institution that housed children removed from their families, part of the Stolen Generation.

Its history has been a major factor in the many social and economic problems which have beset the island since: in 2006 it was reported that the community suffered from chronic alcohol, drug and domestic abuse, high unemployment and an average life expectancy of 50 years, 30 less than the Australian average. Economist Helen Hughes wrote in 2007 that the state of affairs was largely due to the establishment of the "penal settlement in 1918 for Aborigines unwilling to be docile, underpaid bush and domestic workers", and historical and current "apartheid-like" policies: the Queensland Government was failing the community by "stalling the Commonwealth's efforts to improve policing, education and health and to introduce private property rights".
