= Barber Island =

Island in Queensland, Australia

Native name: Boodthean
- Interactive map of Barber Island

Geography
- Coordinates: 18°46′37″S 146°39′58″E
- Archipelago: Palm Islands, Queensland

Administration
- Australia
- State: Queensland
- Local Government Area: Palm Island Aboriginal Shire Council

Barber Island is a tiny island just south of Great Palm Island, part of the Palm Islands group in Queensland, Australia. The Aboriginal name for this island is Boodthean. Barber Island is one of the ten islands in the local government area of the Palm Island Aboriginal Shire Council.

The surrounding waters are in the Great Barrier Reef Marine Park in the Coral Sea, which is administrated by the Great Barrier Reef Marine Park Authority (GBRMPA). The GBRMPA zoning is "Conservation Zone". In a Conservation Zone, as compared with a Buffer zone; bait netting, crabbing (trapping), and limited collecting are permitted. In a Conservation Zone, as compared with a Habitat Protection Zone, harvest fishing for sea cucumber, trochus, and tropical rock lobster are not allowed.

Barber (Boodthean) Reef is a nearshore fringing reef adjacent to the island.

== Aerial photos and maps ==
- "Barber (Boodthean) Reef" (Map). Google Maps.
- "satellite view of Barber (Boodthean) Island" (Map). Google Maps.
