= Esk Island =

Island in Queensland, Australia

Soopun
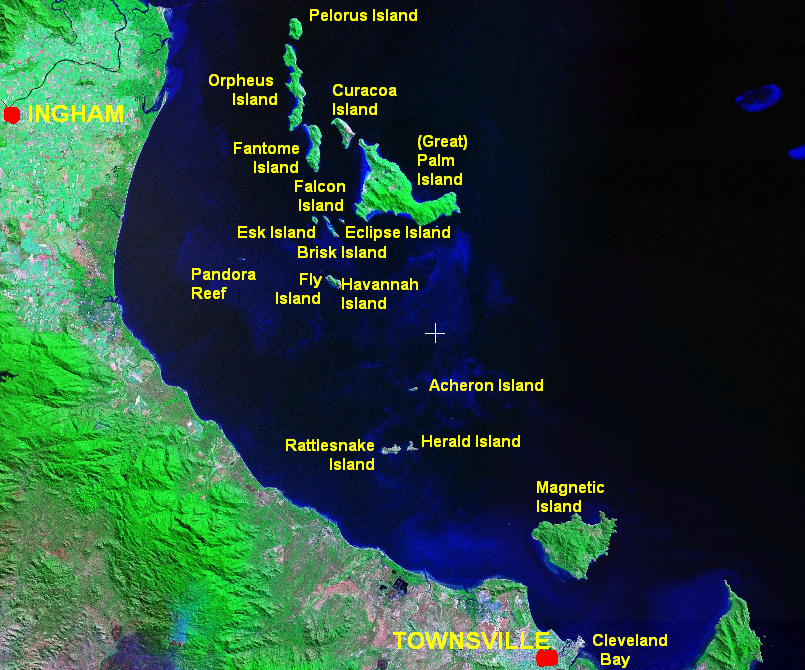
- Esk Island and surrounds

Geography
- Coordinates: 18°46′08″S 146°31′08″E
- Archipelago: Palm Islands, Queensland

Administration
- Australia

Esk Island is one of the small uninhabited islands in the Palm Islands group. The nearest island is Falcon Island. The Aboriginal name for the island is Soopun. Along with nine of the other islands within the Palm Islands group, it falls under the local government area of the Aboriginal Shire of Palm Island.

The island was gazetted as an Aboriginal reserve on 20 September 1941, along with neighbouring small islands, with the intention of extending Palm Island Aboriginal Settlement, but it was never used as such.

== See also ==
- List of islands of Queensland
