= Falcon Island =

Island in Queensland, Australia

Falcon Island (Carbooroo)
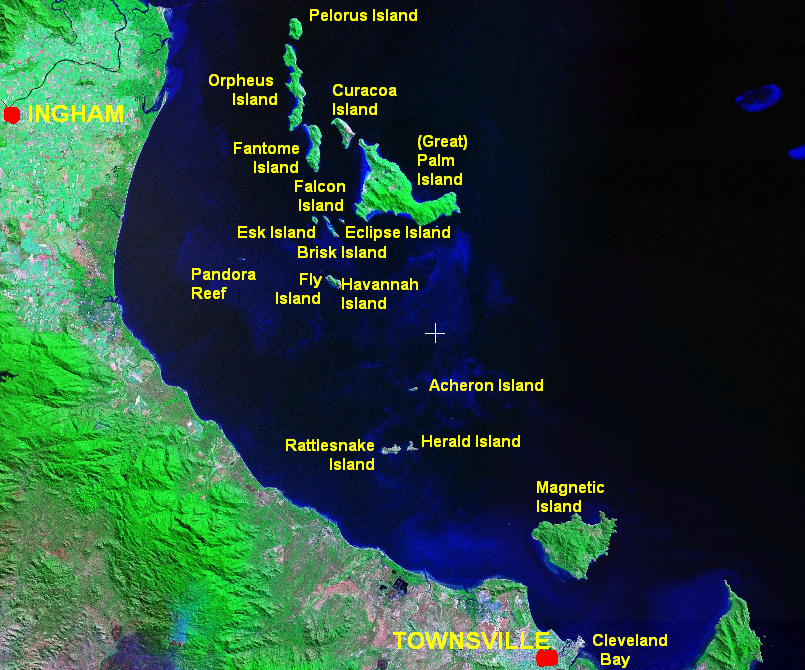
- Falcon Island and surrounds

Geography
- Coordinates: 18°46′08″S 146°31′59″E
- Archipelago: Palm Islands, Queensland

Administration
- Australia

Falcon Island is one of the islands in the Palm Islands group, off the eastern coast of Queensland, Australia. The nearest island is Esk Island. The Nyawaygi name of the island is Carbooroo. Along with nine of the other islands within the Palm Islands group, it falls under the local government area of the Aboriginal Shire of Palm Island.

The island was gazetted as an Aboriginal reserve on 20 September 1941, along with neighbouring small islands, with the intention of extending Palm Island Aboriginal Settlement, but it was never used as such.

== See also ==
- List of islands of Queensland
