= Fly Island =

Island in Queensland

Coordinates: 18°49′37″S 146°31′37″E

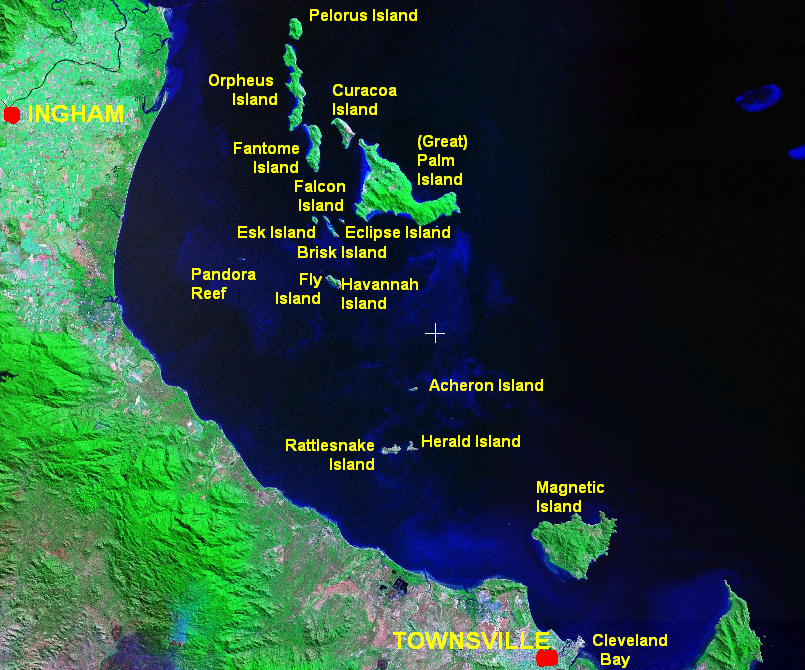
- Fly Island is just north of Havannah Island
- Interactive map of Fly Island

Geography
- Archipelago: Greater Palm group

Administration
- Australia
- State: Queensland
- Local government area: Palm Island Aboriginal Shire Council

Fly Island is a tiny uninhabited island in the Great Palm Island group. Along with nine of the other islands within the Palm Islands group, it falls under the local government area of the Aboriginal Shire of Palm Island.

The island was gazetted as an Aboriginal reserve on 20 September 1941, along with neighbouring small islands, with the intention of extending Palm Island Aboriginal Settlement, but it was never used as such.

Fly Island is a few hundred metres northwest of Havannah Island and 50 kilometres (31 mi) southeast of Ingham. The nearest island to the west is Pandora Reef.

== See also ==
- List of islands of Australia
