= Palm Island, Queensland =

Locality consisting of a group of islands in Queensland, Australia

Palm Island
- Suburb
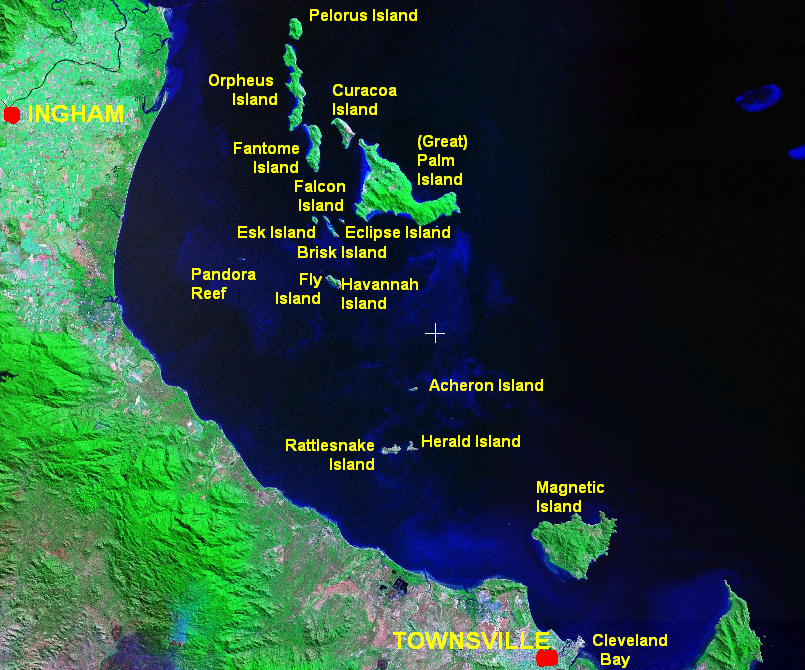
- Palm Islands group, showing Townsville to the south

- Interactive map of Palm Island
- Coordinates: 18.7063°S 146.5483°E
- Country: Australia
- State: Queensland
- LGAs: Aboriginal Shire of Palm Island; Shire of Hinchinbrook

Government
  - State electorate: Townsville
  - Federal division: Herbert

Area
  - Total: 642.1 km^{2} (247.9 sq mi)

Population
  - Total: 2,138 (2021 census)
  - Density: 3.3297/km^{2} (8.6239/sq mi)
- Time zone: UTC+10:00 (AEST)
- Postcode: 4816

Palm Island is a locality consisting of an island group of 16 islands, split between the Shire of Hinchinbrook and the Aboriginal Shire of Palm Island, in Queensland, Australia. The locality coincides with the geographical entity known as the Palm Island group, also known as the Greater Palm group, originally named the Palm Isles.

However, the term "Palm Island" is most often used to refer to the main island, Great Palm Island, the largest island in the group and the only one with a significant population of permanent residents, most of whom are Aboriginal. The island is also known by the name "Bwgcolman", meaning "one people from many groups", derived from an Aboriginal language of one of the earliest groups of Aboriginal people removed from the mainland and settled there from 1918 onwards, during its use as an Aboriginal reserve.

The term "Palm Island" is sometimes used to refer to the island group, sometimes the Aboriginal Shire, and sometimes Great Palm Island, but as most of the other islands are uninhabited, the majority of sources are actually referring to Great Palm only, or to the Aboriginal Shire Council.

Orpheus Island has a tourist resort and research facility, and is the only one with a well-developed tourist industry.

In the 2021 census, the locality of Palm Island (incorporating all the island in the group) had a population of 2,138 people, of whom 1,918 (89.7%) identify as Indigenous Australians.

== Geography ==
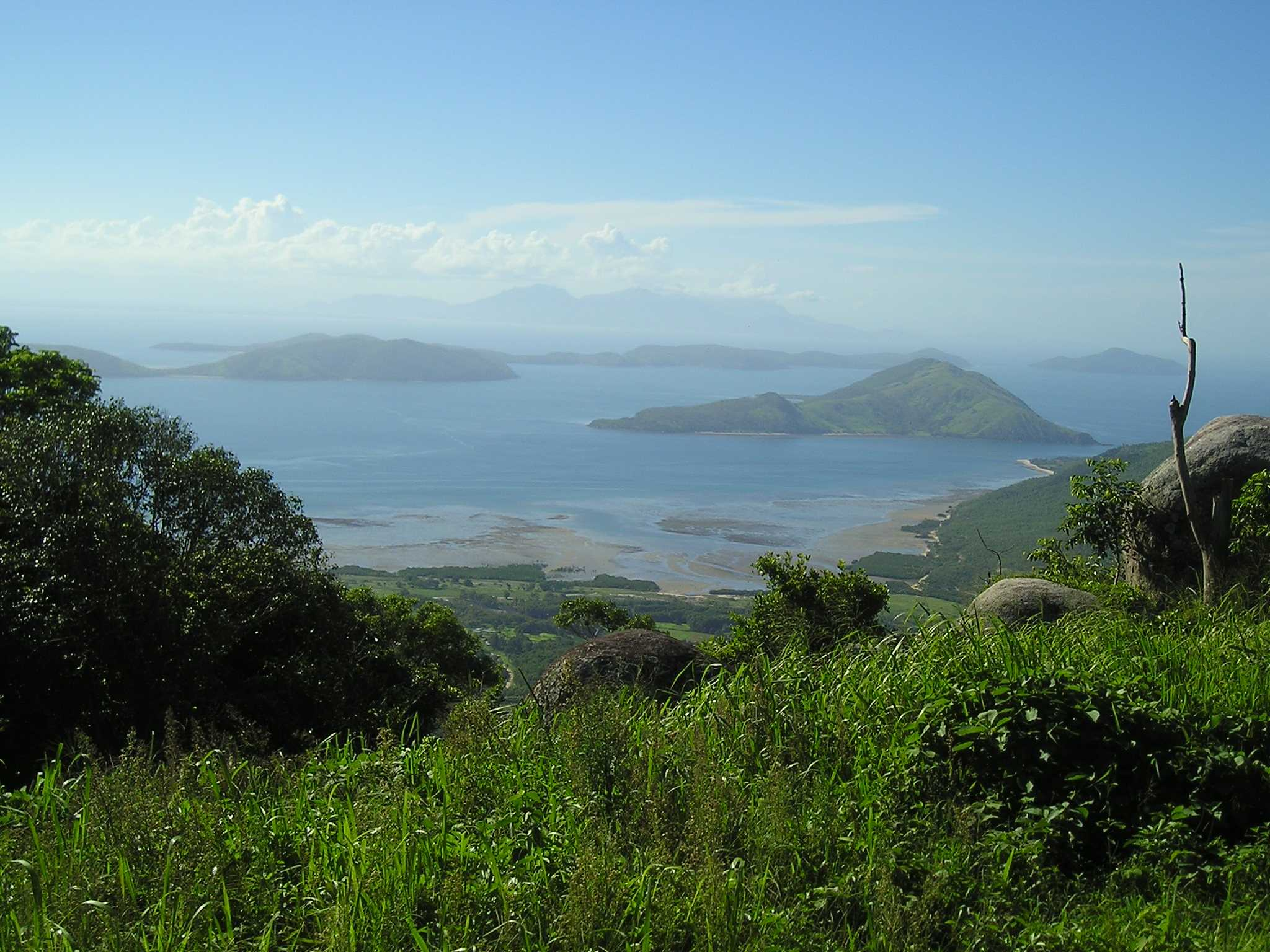
View of nearby islands from Mount Bently, Palm Island

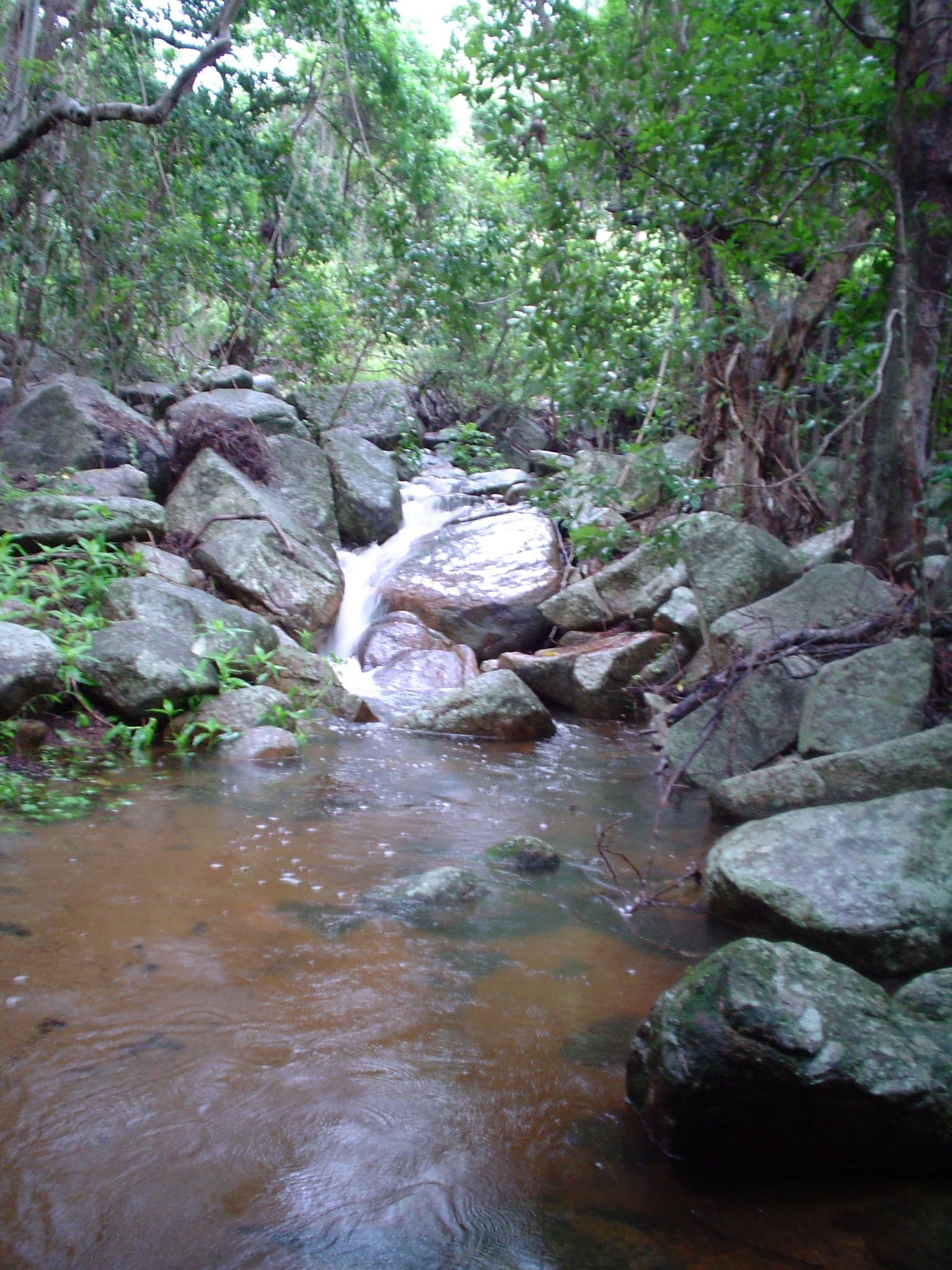
Palm Island Swimming hole – 'Palm Valley'

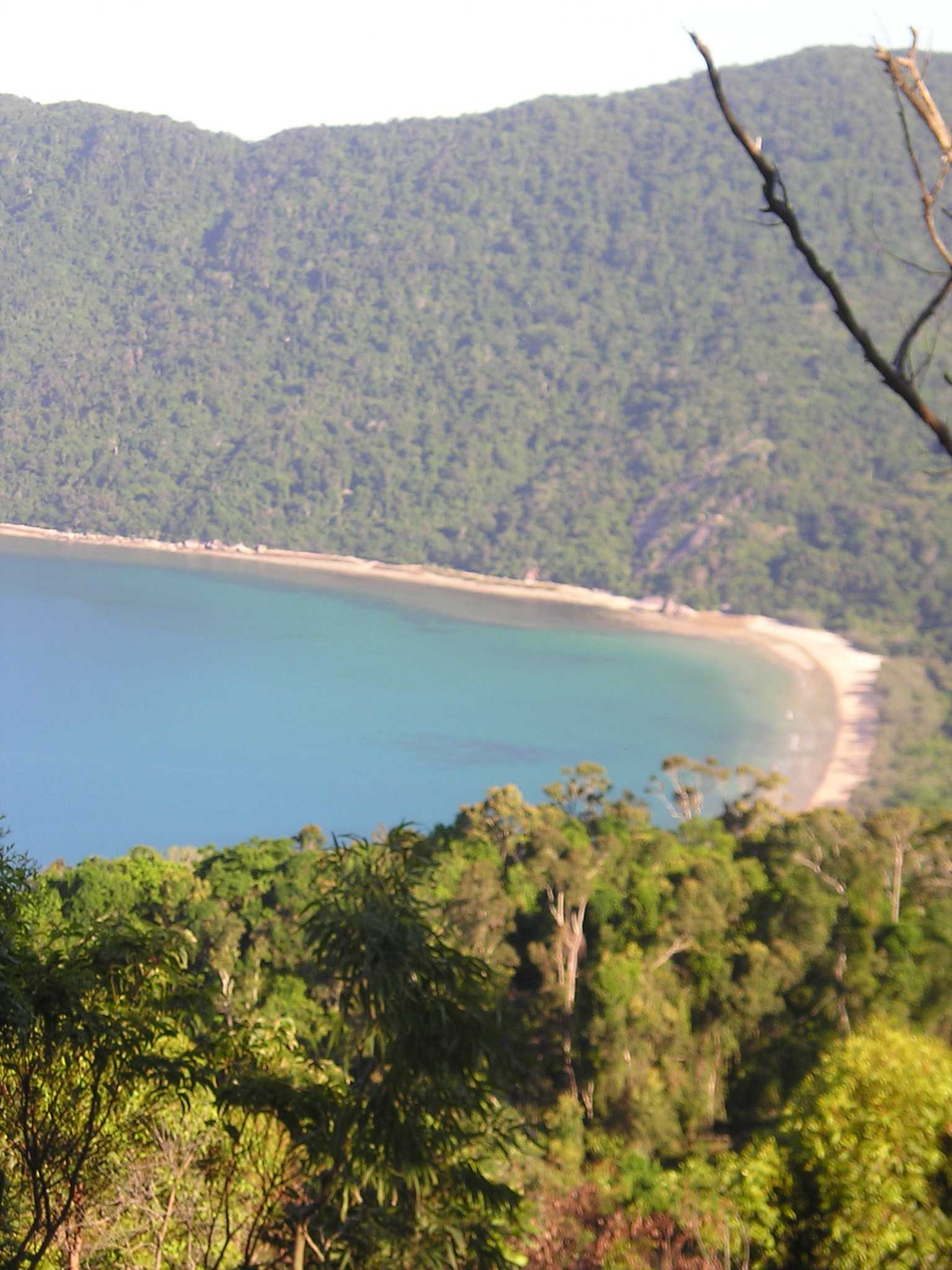
Palm Island, North-east bay

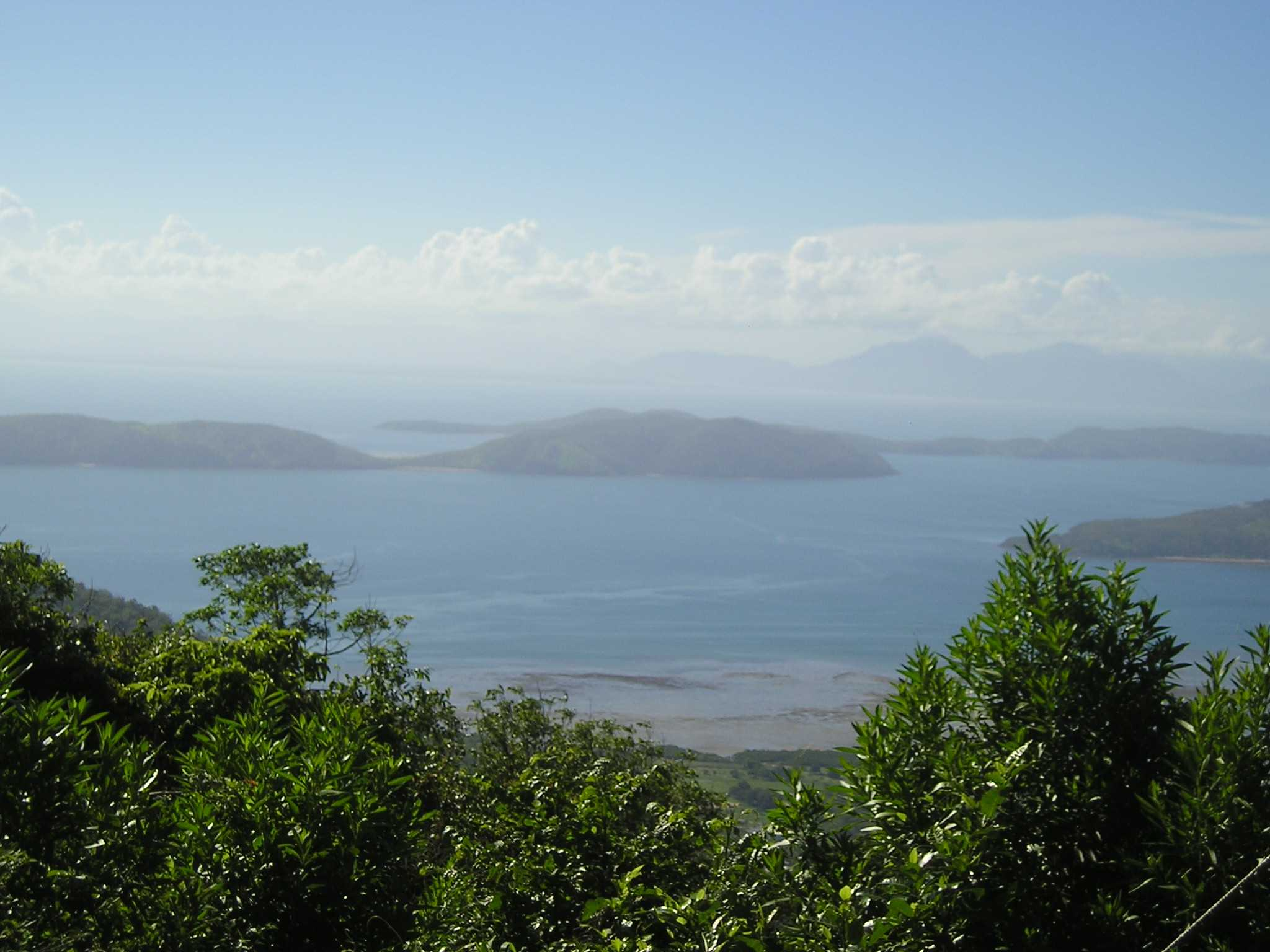
Fantome Island and Orpheus Islands seen from Palm Island

There are 16 islands that make up the Greater Palm group, 12 of them named. The islands listed from north to south, are:

- Pelorus Island (North Palm Island, Yanooa, Guyroogarrie) – uninhabited and privately owned
- Orpheus Island (Goolboddi – contains national park, research facility and tourist resort, privately owned)
  - Albino Rock is part of Orpheus Island National Park.
- Curacoa Island (Noogoo or Inoogoo)
- Fantome Island (Eumilli)
- Great Palm Island (Bwgcolman)
- Esk Island (Soopun)
- Falcon Island (Carbooroo)
- Eclipse Island (Garoogubbee)
- Brisk Island (Culgarul)
- Barber Island (Boodthean)
- Fly Island
- Havannah Island

The group was originally named the "Palm Isles" (see History, below), while other current names for the island group are the Palm Island group and the Greater Palm group. The majority of the islands are micro-islands; the most notable are Great Palm Island (the largest and only one with a permanent population), Fantome Island, and Orpheus Island.

The ocean surrounding the islands is part of the Great Barrier Reef Marine Park, where extraction and fishing are regulated. Neighbouring islands outside the Palm group include Rattlesnake Island, which is used for Air Force bombing practice, and Magnetic Island, an island suburb of Townsville. The nearest island to the group is Pandora Reef.

Table 1 shows the micro-islands, known as rocks, and their Great Barrier Reef Marine Park Authority (GBRMPA) designations.

Table 1. Micro-islands known as Rocks in the group
Island name	GBRMPA reef designation
Paluma Rock	18-056
Albino Rock (AKA White Rock)	18-057
Dido Rock	18-060
Chilcott Rocks	18-063
Hayman Rock.	<none>

== Origins ==
Today's population are descendants of people taken to the Palm Island Aboriginal Settlement from 1914 up to 1971. Estimates vary, but the number of tribal groups represented by the descendants (known as the Bwgcolman people) is at least 43 and has been said to represent 57 different language groups. At least 5000 people were forcibly removed to the reserve from all over Queensland, the Torres Strait and Melanesian islands. The majority of the current population descend from peoples occupying the region between Bowen and Tully, from north-western Queensland, and from the Cape York Peninsula.

== Governance and settlements ==
The locality of Palm Island falls in the federal Division of Herbert and the Electoral district of Townsville.

Local government of the islands is split: the two most northerly islands, Pelorus and Orpheus, are in the Shire of Hinchinbrook, while the other ten are in the Aboriginal Shire of Palm Island. Table 2 (below) shows the ten islands of the group in the jurisdiction of the Palm Island Aboriginal Shire Council. The remaining rocks, listed above, are owned by the Commonwealth and are in the jurisdiction of the Great Barrier Reef Marine Park Authority (GBRMPA).

Australia Post lists only one postcode for "Palm Island, QLD" (4816), which refers to the island group; there is no formal name for the settled areas of Great Palm Island. The main town has on Great Palm has schools, shops, a football club, hospital and churches. The town area, next to the jetty where the ferries dock, has no formal name, and is still called "the Mission" by some of the locals. It is referred to as "Palm Islands" on the Queensland Government place names database. In addition to the town, there are several small settlement areas to the north and south, but the roads are limited to the western side of the island.

The islands within Palm Island Aboriginal Shire have alcohol restrictions: the maximum amount of alcohol a person can carry in the restricted area is 11.25 litres (2.47 imp gal; 2.97 US gal) of any liquor with a concentration of less than 4 per cent. While it is not a completely dry zone, "sly grog" sales are not permitted and penalties apply for breaches of the law. There is one licensed premises in the restricted area, the Coolgaree Bay Sports Bar and Bistro, where alcohol can only be sold for on-premises or off-premises consumption to a patron with a valid membership card.

Table 2. Islands in Palm Island Aboriginal Shire Council jurisdiction
Island name	Aboriginal name	Group size	Bushfire risk	GBRMPA reef designation
Curra-cao or Curacoa Island	Noogoo or Inoogoo	major	medium	18-052
Fantome Island	Eumilli	major	medium	18-053
Great Palm Island or Palm Island	Bwgcolman	major	high	18-054
Havannah Island		major	medium	18-065
Brisk Island	Culgarool	micro-island	medium	shared with Falcon Island
Eclipse Island	Garoogubbee	micro-island	not rated	18-058
Esk Island	Soopun	micro-island	not rated	18-059
Barber Island	Boodthean	micro-island	not rated	18-061
Falcon Island	Carbooroo	micro-island	not rated	18-062
Fly Island		micro-island	not rated	18-064

== Climate ==
Lying in the tropical zone, the islands' climate is tropical and the area is vulnerable to cyclones.

== History ==
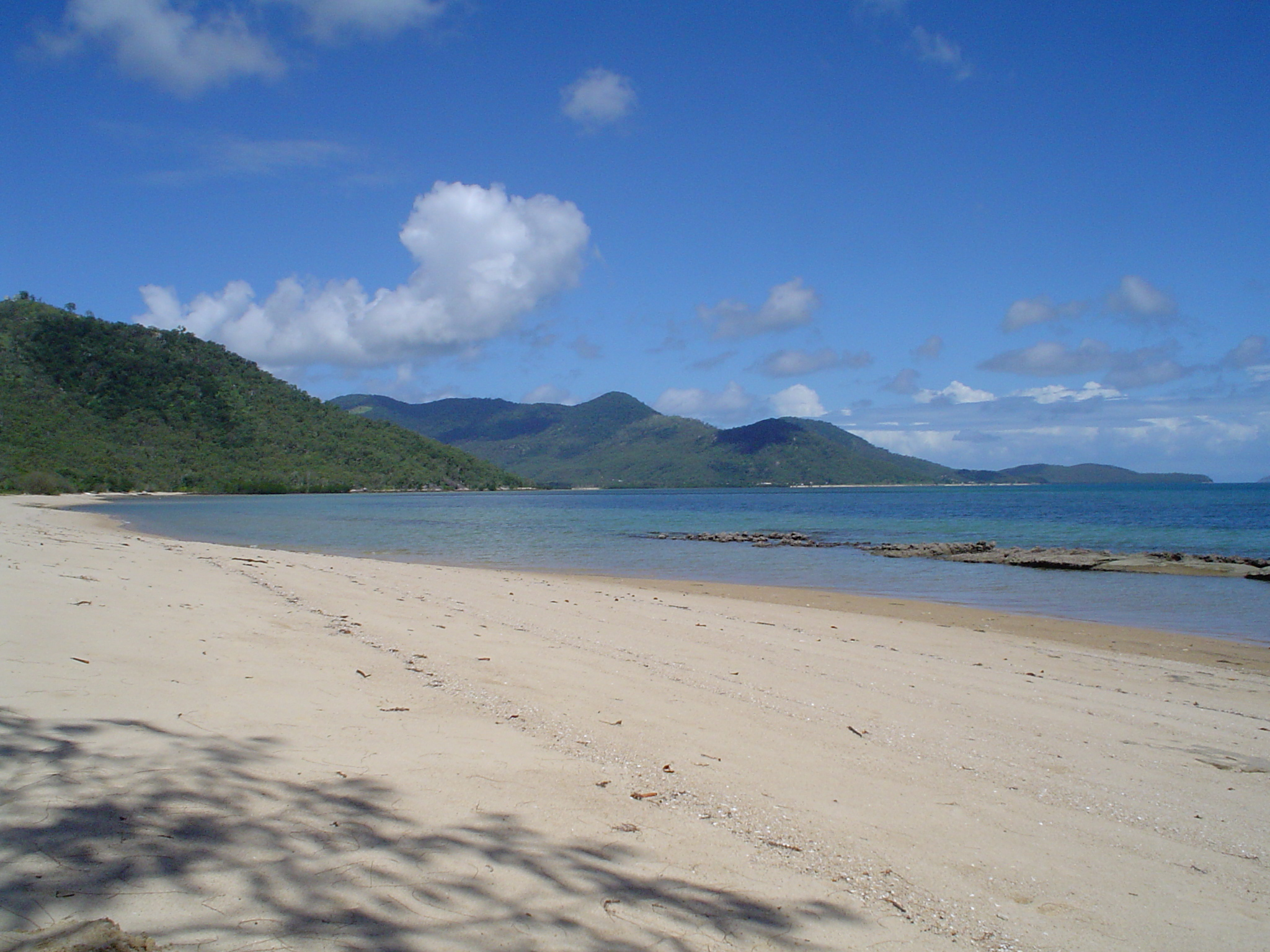
View of Palm Island from Wallaby Point

=== Pre-contact ===
The Manbarra people are the traditional owners of Great Palm and nearby islands. In Manbarra beliefs the Palm Island group were formed in the Dreamtime from the broken up fragments of an ancestral spirit, Rainbow Serpent. Manbarra (also known as Wulgurukaba) is a language of the Palm Island region, which lies within the local government boundaries of the Palm Island Aboriginal Shire Council.

In the Hinchinbrook shire, the traditional owners of Orpheus Island were the Nywaigi, while the Warakamai inhabited Hinchinbrook Island.

The islands in the area were named the "Palm Isles" by explorer James Cook in 1770 as he sailed up the eastern coast of Australia on his first voyage. It is estimated that the population of the island at the time of Cook's visit was about 200 Manbarra people. Cook sent some of his men to Palm Island and "they returned on board having met with nothing worth observing".

In 1819, Captain Phillip Parker King landed on one of the islands and recorded seeing recently occupied circular huts, and canoes nearby their landing place.

=== (Great) Palm Island history ===
Great Palm Island has always been the most populated island. It is estimated that the population of the island at the time of Cook's 1770 visit was about 200 people. From the 1850s, locals were enticed away to join bêche-de-mer and pearling enterprises with Europeans and Japanese, and by the end of the 19th century the population had been reduced to about 50.

In 1914, the Palm Island Aboriginal Settlement was created by the Queensland Government, and relocated people from 1918 all over Queensland, starting with Hull River Mission residents after the mission was destroyed by a cyclone. People from up to 57 language groups were moved there. In the first two decades of its existence, the number of residents rose from 200 to 1,630. It was regarded as a penal settlement, with people being sent there for perceived wrongdoing, and soon it became the largest government Aboriginal reserve in Queensland.

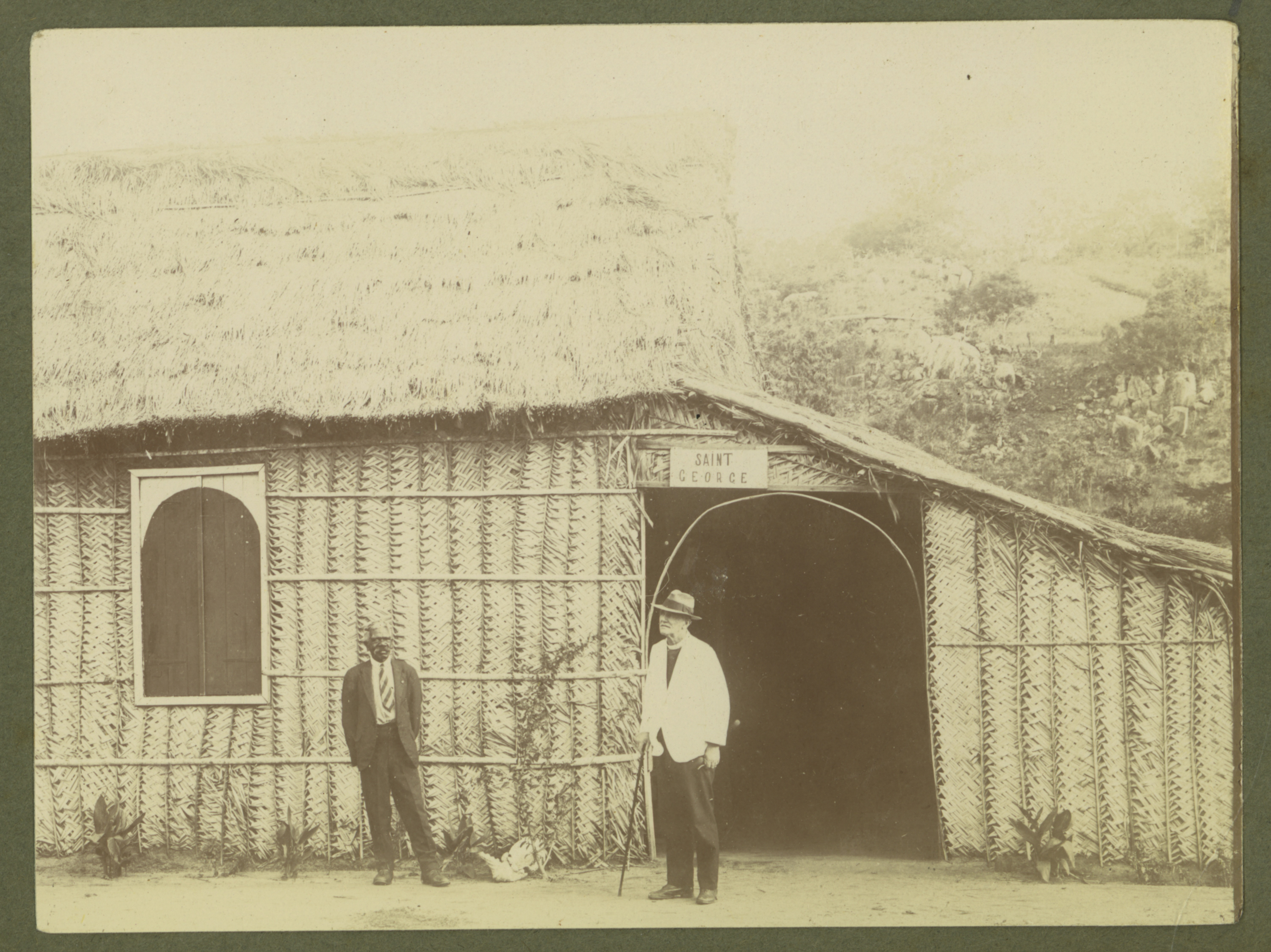
First St George's Anglican Church, circa 1932

St George's Anglican Church was built in 1931 from palm leaves and grass (approx 18.735774°S 146.577°E). On Wednesday 4 July 1935, a new timber St George's Anglican Church was opened and dedicated by Bishop John Feetham.

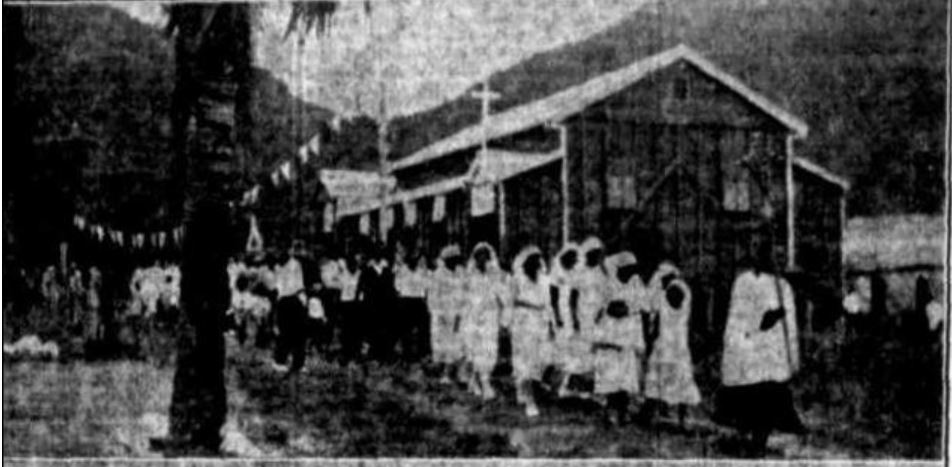
Dedication of St George's Anglican Church, 1935

During World War II, the Naval Air Station Palm Island (aka Palm Island Airfield) was built at Wallaby Point in 1943 by the US Navy’s 55 Construction Battalion (Seabees). It was a seaplane maintenance facility with a concrete slipway which was predominantly used to serve PBY Catalina flying boats.

St Anthony's Catholic Church in the Parish of St Anne was blessed and opened on Sunday 6 August 1961 by Bishop H. E. Ryan. It was designed and built from stone by Townsville consulting engineers, Ariotti and Norman. It is at 26 Banfield Drive (within the grounds of the Catholic school, 18.73899°S 146.57774°E).

The women's dormitory closed in 1967 and was demolished in 1969. The children's dormitories were officially closed on 5 December 1975.

==== 1978: Sacking of the Aboriginal Council ====
The Aboriginal Council of Palm Island was sacked by Joh Bjelke-Petersen's government in July 1978. This followed moves by the Queensland Government to hand over control of Palm Island to Townsville Council, which was opposed by islanders in a petition instigated by Labor senator Jim Keeffe. Denis Freney, writing in Tribune, reported that the decision was made based on a counter-petition run by the government which contained many signatures of Aboriginal people which had been forged or obtained by duplicity, and was "part of a plan by the Bjelke-Petersen government to ride roughshod over the wishes of the 1305 residents of the island and open it up to property speculators and tourist development". He wrote that both petitions contained many of the same people's signatures.

==== 1999: Compensation by Queensland Government for underpaid wages ====
In 1999 the Queensland Government apologised and gave A$7,000 compensation each to former Palm Islander employees in recompense for underpaid wages between 1975 and 1986. The payment was ordered by the Human Rights and Equal Opportunity Commission in a case first brought to the commission by seven Palm Islanders in 1986.

==== 2004: Death in custody and consequences ====
On 19 November 2004, Palm Island resident Mulrunji (known as Cameron Doomadgee while alive), aged 36 or 37, died in a police cell on Palm Island, one hour after being picked up for allegedly causing a public nuisance. After the post-mortem report said that the cause of death was severe internal injuries, riots occurred, and as a result, a number of people were charged with offences.

Two coronial inquests were held, a police officer was tried for manslaughter, but acquitted on 20 June 2007. The Crime and Misconduct Commission examined police relations in Queensland and as part of this, conducted an inquiry into police handling of the Mulrunji investigation. In 2010 it reported that more work was needed on police relations, while noting that some improvement had occurred, recommending 51 specific actions.

The police raids and behaviour following the riot were found in December 2016 to have breached the Racial Discrimination Act 1975, with a record class action settlement of A$30 million awarded to victims in May 2018. The raids were found by the court to be "racist" and "unnecessary, disproportionate" with police having "acted in these ways because they were dealing with an Aboriginal community".

=== Fantome Island medical facilities (1926–1973) ===
In 1926 a lock hospital was built on Fantome Island; Aboriginal people were sent there mainly for treatment of sexually transmitted diseases. In 1937 Fantome Island became a medical clearing station, where Aboriginal people sent to Palm Island were examined and treated if necessary. A leprosarium was established on Fantome in 1939.

The hospital was closed in 1945, and the leprosarium in 1973, when the inhabitants were moved to (Great) Palm Island.

=== 2004: Legal action relating to pearl farming ===
Zen Pearls Pty Ltd and Indian Pacific Pearls Pty Ltd (both controlled by Michael Crimp) established pearl farms in 1998 with the permission of the Great Barrier Reef Marine Park Authority (which controls the sea waters around the islands), despite the opposition of, at least some, of the people of Palm Island. On 24 September 1998 the Manbarra elders passed a resolution opposing the farms on the basis of;

"the historical and cultural significance of the Juno Bay site for both the Manbarra and Bwgcolman Peoples, the sense of trespass on traditional ownership rights, concerns that the cultural connection to the area would slip away and a strong feeling that the provision of a small number of employment opportunities offered by the pearling operations would not adequately compensate the damage to cultural values."

Subsequently, the Park Authority refused to extend the pearl farming permits and Crimp took action before the Administrative Appeals Tribunal to have this decision reversed. On 15 March 2004 the Tribunal agreed that the permits should be terminated but allowed the existing pearling operations to continue to 1 December 2005. This decision was substantially upheld by the Federal Court on 21 October 2004.

== Demographics ==
The Indigenous population generally identify with either the Bwgcolman (descendants of Aboriginal and Torres Strait Islander people removed to Palm Island from throughout Queensland by the authorities, or Manbarra (original inhabitants) people. As of 2007, the community consisted of approximately 42 Aboriginal Australian and Torres Strait Islander clan or family groups.

In the 2016 census, the locality of Palm Island had a population of 2,455 people, of whom 74.5% identify as Australian Aboriginal and 12.8% identify as Torres Strait Islander. The Palm Island community was younger than Australians as a whole, with 32.0% under 15 and only 3.3% over 64, and they were more religious. The most common responses for religion were Catholic 50.4%, Anglican 19.4%, Other Protestant 8.5%, Baptist 5.0% (total 91.2% Christian) and No Religion 8.1% (compared with 29.2% for Queensland). 92.2% of respondents reported speaking only English at home (compared with 81.2% for Queensland), the next most common being Yumplatok (Torres Strait Creole) at 0.2%. 702 people were in the available workforce: of these, 38.6% were employed full-time, 28.3% were employed part-time and 29.1% were unemployed. The median weekly personal income for people aged 15 years and over was A$306 (compared with A$660 in Queensland). 93.8% of occupied private dwellings were rented. Level of education achieved was much lower than Queensland as a whole, with only a tiny number having any higher or further education.

In the 2021 census, the locality of Palm Island had a population of 2,138 people, of whom 1,918 (89.7%) identify as Indigenous Australians.

== Education ==
Palm Island Settlement State School opened in 1926, but closed in 1927. A mission school operated on the island in 1930s. In 1962, Palm Island Settlement School opened, being renamed Palm Island State School, and in 1994 was renamed Bwgcolman Community School.

The Sisters of Our Lady Help of Christians established St Michael's Catholic Convent in 1934. They established a temporary Catholic school in October 1934 with 97 students, but a lack of funds prevented the establishment of a permanent Catholic school until 1938. St Michael's Catholic School was blessed on Sunday 24 July 1938 by the Apostolic Delegate Giovanni (John) Panico. In 1945, the Sisters of Our Lady Help of Christians were replaced by the Franciscan Missionaries of Mary. In 1969, the school was relocated as it was in the way of the development of the airport. From 1979 to 1991, the school was under lay leadership, before the Sisters of the Good Samaritan took over in 1992.

Palm Island Provisional School opened in 1938 for the children of the white officials on the island. It closed in 1970.

As at 2022, there are two schools on Palm Island, both on Great Palm Island.

Bwgcolman Community School is an Indigenous community primary and secondary (Early Childhood-12) school for boys and girls on Creek Road (18.7362°S 146.5781°E). In 2018, the school had an enrolment of 249 students with 30 teachers and 28 non-teaching staff (23 full-time equivalent). It includes a special education program.

St Michael's Catholic School is a Catholic primary (Prep-6) school for boys and girls on Banfield Highway (18.7366°S 146.5769°E). In 2018, the school had an enrolment of 101 students with 8 teachers and 13 non-teaching staff (12 full-time equivalent).

Bwgcolman Indigenous Knowledge Centre (IKC) is owned and operated by the Palm Island Aboriginal Shire Council (PIASC), providing a community space that builds community capacity through combining library services with a range of training, learning and information activities. These activities enable access to information knowledge and culture, developing the capacity of community members to participate in social and economic opportunities. The IKC has played a vital role as a historical information centre, connecting local community, and visitors with historical connections, with family history records.

== Transport ==
Sealink Queensland runs a ferry every day from Townsville to Great Palm Island each day of the week except Tuesday, with the journey taking around an hour and 15 minutes. There is also a daily ferry and barge from Lucinda. Palm Island Airport is on Great Palm Island and is operated by the shire council. Hinterland Aviation operates several flights on each weekday between 7am and 4:30pm, and Townsville Helicopters operates on-demand helicopter flights to and from Palm Island, also from Townsville Airport.

There is a daily scheduled helicopter flight from Townsville to the luxury resort on Orpheus Island and back, and private helicopter charter flights are available from Townsville, Cairns or other nearby facilities.

== Tourism ==
In the locality of Palm Island, only Orpheus Island has a well-developed tourist industry, based around a private luxury resort, the Orpheus Island Lodge.

Some attempts have been made to develop a tourist industry on Great Palm Island, but these have met with limited success. Although the island has tropical rainforest and is rich in diverse flora and fauna, is close to the Great Barrier Reef and its waters abound with tropical fish, making it an ideal spot for eco-tourism, there have been concerns owing to its troubled history and social problems, and its residents need to be ready to embrace the idea of a possible flood of visitors. There are, however some facilities and accommodation on the large island for tourists, such as Klub Kuda. The Palm Island Motel is operated by the council.

== Notable people ==
=== The Clays ===
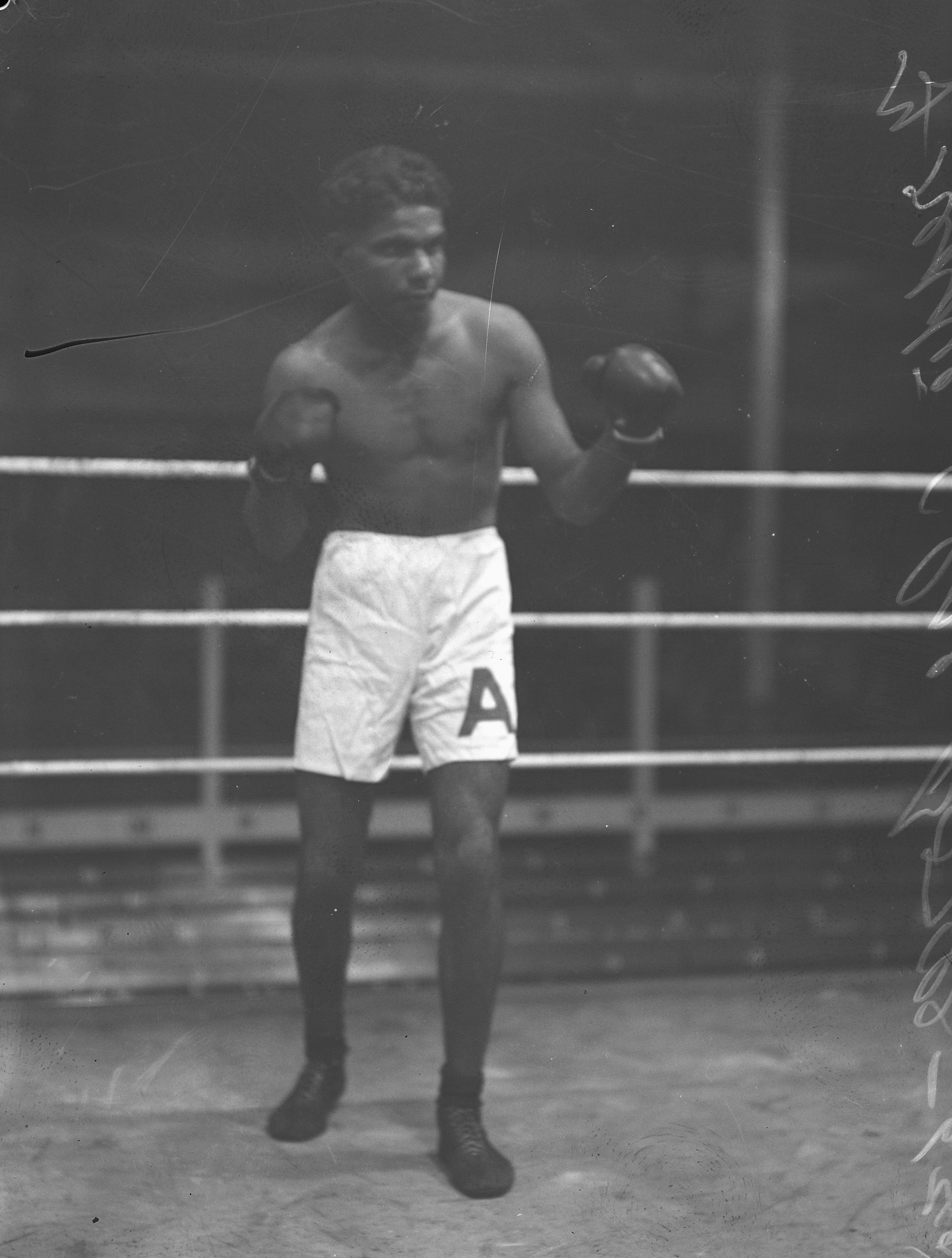
Freddie Clay in 1950

Iris Clay (1936–1979) and her husband Frederick William (Fred, or Freddie) Clay (1927–1983) were Indigenous leaders and activists who fought for equality for the people of Palm Island. Iris worked for the Aboriginal Legal Service on Palm Island, and was a founding member as well as director of Aboriginal Hostels Limited.

"Freddie and Ivy (sic) Clay" were recorded as having been moved to Palm Island in 1935 from Cloncurry. Ivy arrived with her parents and some, but not all, of her siblings in the 1930s. At the age of 15, Fred escaped to the mainland, and got as far as Ingham before he was captured at gunpoint and returned to the reserve. Fred became a boxer around 1950, participating in a match at the Brisbane Stadium in May 1950 (recorded as aged 19?). He was an activist by 1969, when Aboriginal people were not allowed on the main street.

Fred became a councillor on Palm Island Council, including a stint as chairman from 1973 to 1974. During this time, the council sought to obtain federal government funding so that Palm Islanders could run their own affairs, and develop the island's economy themselves, instead of decisions about the people coming under Queensland's oppressive Aborigines Act 1971 and the Torres Strait Islanders Act 1971. He was president of the council at the time of its sacking by the Bjelke-Petersen government in July 1978, and later deported from the island, along with Bill Rosser (see below).

Clay Street in the suburb of Bonner, Australian Capital Territory, was named in honour of Iris and Fred Clay in 2009. In 2014, the Frederick William Clay Park was opened on the foreshore of the town on Palm Island.

=== Bill Rosser ===
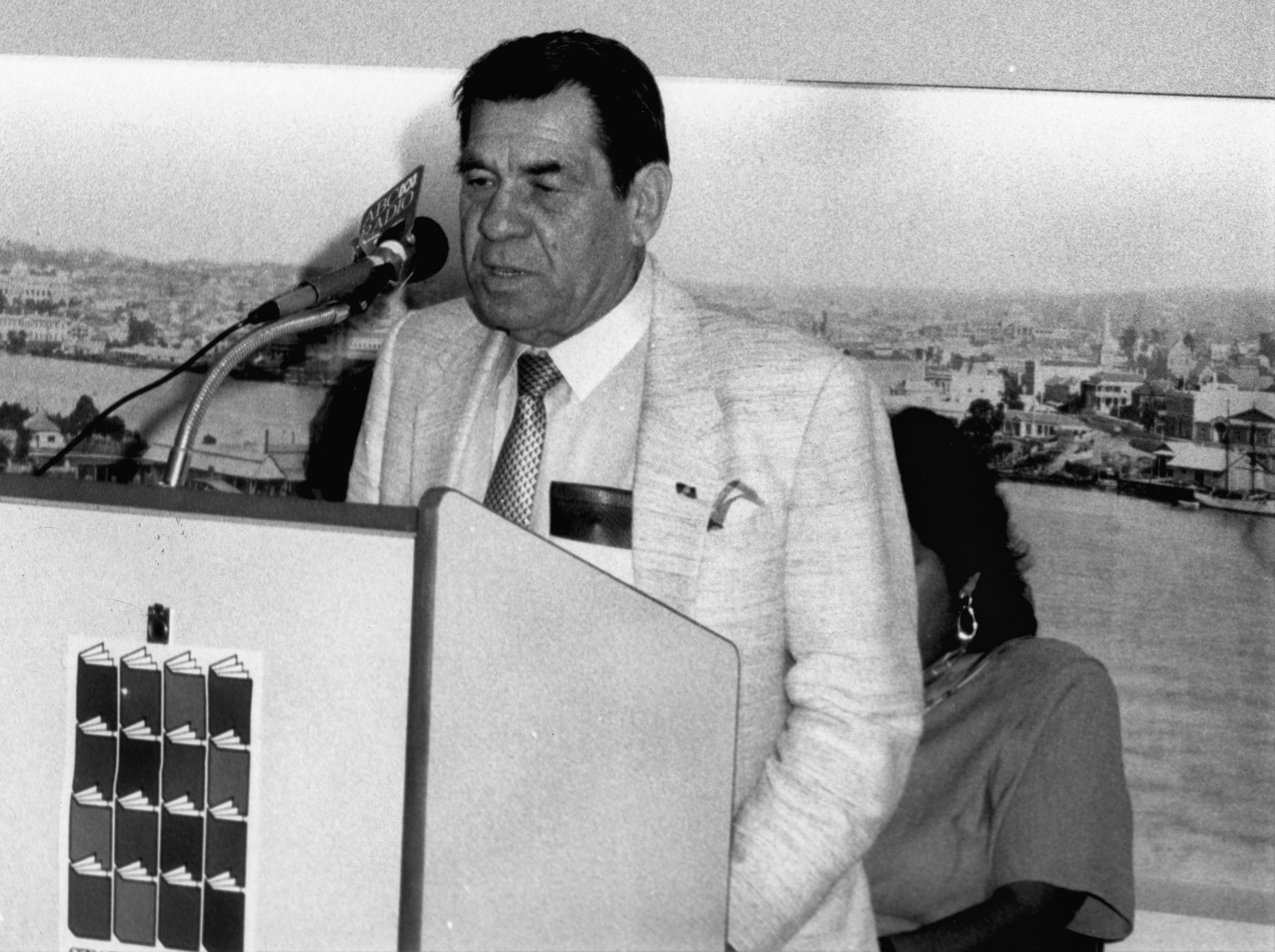
Bill Rosser speaking at John Oxley Library, 1991

Bill Rosser, aka B. R. Rosser (13 May 1927 – May 2002), author of This is Palm Island (1978), Return to Palm Island (1994) and many other books, was also a union organiser. He visited Palm Island at the invitation of Iris Clay (whom he had met at the Federal Council for the Advancement of Aborigines and Torres Strait Islanders in Townsville) in 1974, and was shocked at the extent to which the life of Aboriginal people was prescribed by the Queensland laws.

Rosser, Fred Clay and others tried started a newsletter called Smoke Signal (aka Palm Island Smoke Signal) in 1974, describing the life of Aboriginal people under the current legislation. The newsletter ran for at least 12 issues. Clay and Rosser were subsequently deported from the island.

Rosser later produced another publication for Aboriginal people, called Black Knight, in Brisbane (1975).
