= Havannah Island =

Island in Queensland, Australia

Havannah
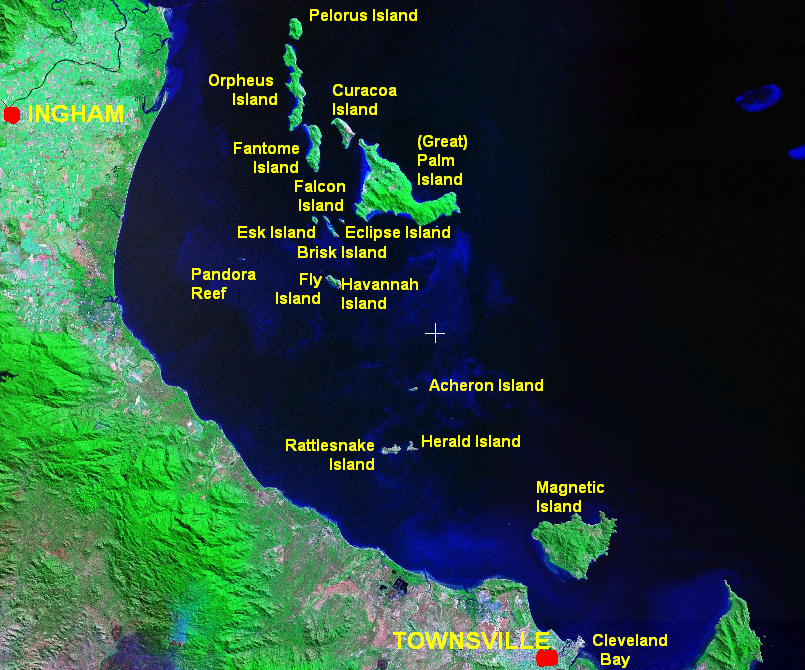
- Havannah Island is shown near the centre of the map

Geography
- Coordinates: 18°50′24″S 146°32′31″E
- Archipelago: Great Palm Island group

Administration
- Australia

Demographics
- Population: 0

Havannah Island is one of the islands in the Palm Island group. The nearest island is Great Palm Island, after which the group is named. Havannah Island is the southernmost island in the group, and uninhabited. Along with nine of the other islands within the Palm Islands group, it falls under the local government area of the Aboriginal Shire of Palm Island.

The island was gazetted as an Aboriginal reserve on 20 September 1941, along with neighbouring small islands, with the intention of extending Palm Island Aboriginal Settlement, but it was never used as such.

Havannah island has only one beach landing, which is typical of the smaller islands of the Palm Group. These beaches are located in the northwestern end of the islands and afford a safe anchorage in calm conditions. There is no naturally occurring fresh water on Havannah, Fly or Brisk Islands.

The nearest medical facility to Havannah is on Great Palm Island, along with police and fuel.

== See also ==
- List of islands of Queensland
