= Eclipse Island (Queensland) =

- Coordinates: 18°46′16″S 146°33′07″E
- Country: Australia
- State: Queensland
- LGA: Aboriginal Shire of Palm Island

Government
  - State electorate: Townsville
  - Federal division: Herbert

Eclipse Island
Native name: Garoogubbee
- Interactive map of Eclipse Island

Geography
- Coordinates: 18°46′16″S 146°33′07″E
- Archipelago: Great Palm Island group
- Major islands: Great Palm Island

Administration
- Australia

Additional information
- Uninhabited

Eclipse Island, or Garoogubbee, once known as Punishment Island, is one of the small islands in the Palm Islands group off the coast of Queensland, Australia. The nearest island is Great Palm Island, after which the group is named. Along with nine of the other islands within the Palm Islands group, it falls under the local government area of the Aboriginal Shire of Palm Island.

In March 1921 Eclipse Island was gazetted as an Aboriginal reserve, some years after a government-run reserve, the Palm Island Aboriginal Settlement, had been established on Great Palm Island. Some of the other small Palm Islands were later also designated as reserves in 1948 under Chief Protector John William Bleakley, who targeted them as sites for further institutions for punishing people. There is no record of dwellings or other structures being built on these islands, but Eclipse Island had become known as "Punishment Island" under Superintended Robert Henry Curry (who later murdered four people on the Great Palm Aboriginal Settlement). Curry, as punishment for misdemeanours such as speaking their own language or gambling, would exile men to Eclipse Island, and sometimes Curacoa Island, with only bread and water, sometimes for weeks at a time.

The Aboriginal term for this island is Garoogubbee.

== See also ==
- List of islands of Queensland
