= Pelorus Island =

Island in Queensland, Australia

Coordinates: 18°33′00″S 146°29′46″E

Pelorus
Native name: Djabugay Yanooa
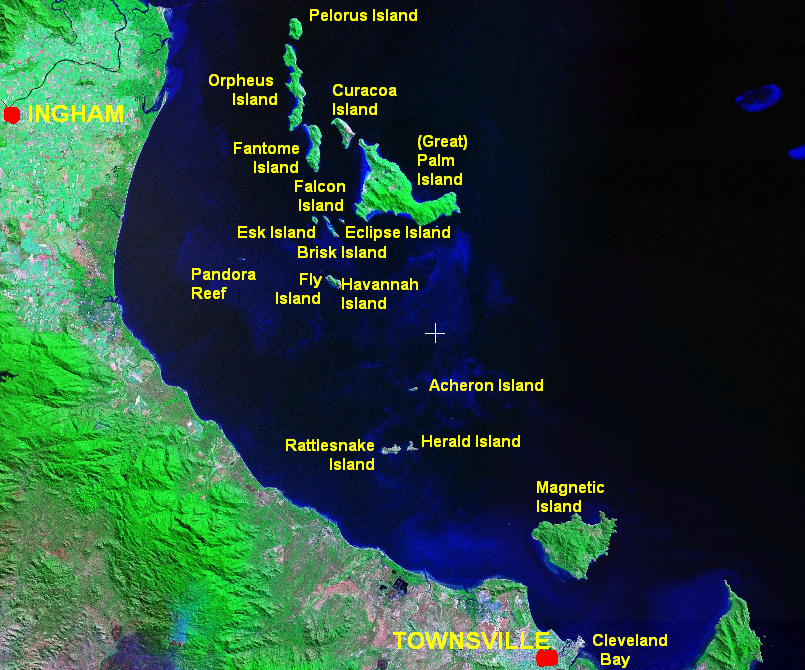
- Pelorus Island is the northmost island shown

Geography
- Archipelago: Palm Islands, Queensland
- Area: 4 km^{2} (1.5 sq mi)
- Length: 2.9 km (1.8 mi)
- Width: 1.7 km (1.06 mi)

Administration
- Australia

Demographics
- Population: 0

Pelorus Island, also known as North Palm Island, is the northernmost island of the Great Palm Island group. It is located 800 metres (2,600 ft) north of Orpheus Island, and covers an area of about 400 hectares (990 acres).

Prior to the arrival of Europeans, Orpheus Island was inhabited by an Aboriginal people, probably the Nyawigi people. It was known as Yanooa and Guyroogarrie in one or more Aboriginal languages (possibly Nyawaygi?). The island was named after HMS Pelorus, flagship on the Australia Station 1860–62.

In 2017 the Morris family bought Pelorus Island, who own the Northern Escape Collection; Chris Morris being the Computershare mogul.

On behalf of the Australian Maritime Safety Authority, Multiplex designed and constructed a navigation structure and helipad to service the structure.

Pelorus is surrounded by spectacular fringing reefs that can be accessed by snorkelling right off the beach. The island is managed by the Hinchinbrook Shire Council, with its fragile environment protected by both state and federal environmental provisions. Permission from Parks Australia is not needed for camping, but there are no facilities or freshwater on the island, so all provisions need to be taken there.

== See also ==
- List of islands of Queensland
