= Curacoa Island =

Island off the coast of Queensland, Australia

Curacoa
Native name: Noogoo
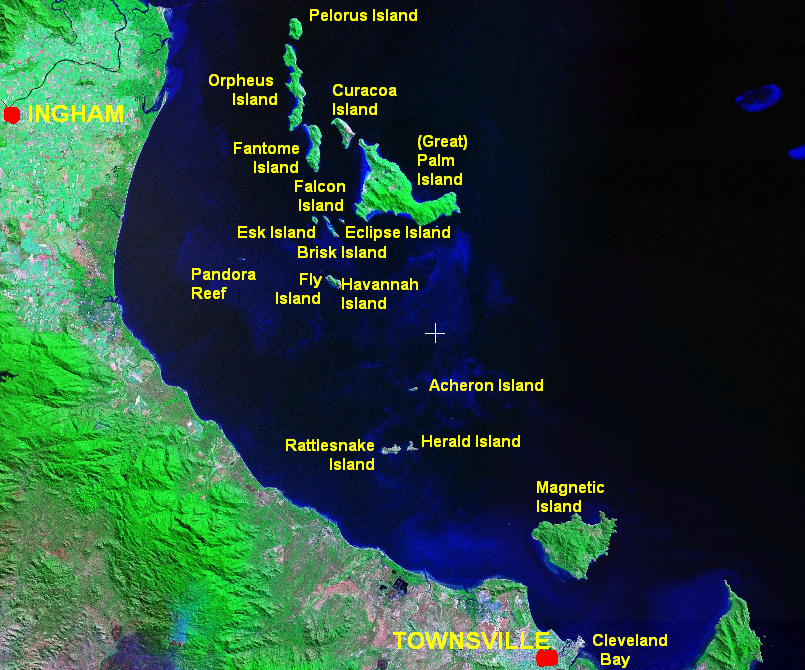
- Map of Curacoa Island and its surrounds

Geography
- Coordinates: 18°40′05″S 146°33′14″E
- Archipelago: Palm Islands, Queensland
- Area: 4.8 km^{2} (1.9 sq mi)

Administration
- Australia

Demographics
- Population: 0

Curacoa Island (pron. KEWR-ə-sow) is one of the islands in the Palm Islands group off the coast of Queensland, Australia. The nearest island is Great Palm Island, after which the group is named. Curacoa Island is uninhabited.

The Aboriginal name for this island is Noogoo Island. Along with nine of the other islands within the Palm Islands group, it falls under the local government area of the Aboriginal Shire of Palm Island.

It was named after HMS Curacoa, flagship of the Australia Station from 20 April 1863 until May 1866.

The island was gazetted as an Aboriginal reserve on 20 September 1941, along with neighbouring small islands, with the intention of extending Palm Island Aboriginal Settlement, but it was never used as such.

== See also ==
- List of islands of Queensland
