= Bwgcolman =

Aboriginal Australians living on Palm Islands, Queensland

The Bwgcolman (pronounced "Bwookamun") is the self-assigned name for the Aboriginal Australians who were deported from many areas of the Queensland mainland, and confined in resettlement on Great Palm Island after the establishment of an Aboriginal reserve there in 1918, the Palm Island Aboriginal Settlement, and their descendants today. The name has also sometimes been applied to the island itself.

== Name ==
Bwgcolman means "many tribes – one people", or "one people from many groups". The word originates from one of the languages of the many among the relocated people, who decided to unite under this name. Created to give a collective identity to the 46 groups who found themselves frequently in conflict because of their disparate linguistic and cultural backgrounds, one source says that the term was devised by the Manbarra elder Dick Palm Island. It is a collective name adopted for the many Palm Islander peoples who, as distinct from the Manbarra (who were there before the reserve was established, but had been moved onto the mainland by the Queensland Government in the 1890s), were subject to coercive displacement from a wide-ranging number of Aboriginal communities on the mainland.

Bwgcolman is also used as a descriptive term in recent claims for native title, where the Bwcgolman are described as the "historical people", while the Manbarra are (arguably) the traditional owners (although this has not been determined by law, and the Bwcgolman "historical people" have an Indigenous land use agreement with the government).

The name has also sometimes been applied to the Island itself.

== People ==
The original inhabitants of Palm Island are the Manbarra people. Indigenous Australians from throughout Queensland (Aboriginal and Torres Strait Islander people) were resettled on Palm Island by the Queensland Chief Protector of Aborigines under provisions of the Aboriginals Protection and Restriction of the Sale of Opium Act 1897 (Queensland). The traditional background of these people is often not known, although individuals trace descent from some 43 different tribal groups.

The people were deported from many areas of the Queensland mainland, as well as the Torres Strait Islands, and confined in to the Aboriginal reserve on Great Palm Island in 1918, known as the Palm Island Aboriginal Settlement.

== 2018 centenary ==
In 2018, a series of official public events were held to mark the Palm Island Centenary, being 100 years since the first Aboriginal people were moved to the reserve, creating the Bwcolman people. The occasion was a time of mourning for many descendants of the Stolen Generations created by the forced removals.

== Sources ==
- Garond, Lise (2014). "'Forty-plus Different tribes': Displacement, Place-making and Aboriginal Tribal Namjes on Palm Island, Australia". In Hermann, Elfriede; Kempf, Wolfgang; van Meijl, Toon (eds.). Belonging in Oceania: Movement, Place-Making and Multiple Identifications. Berghahn Books. pp. 49–70. ISBN 978-1-782-38416-8.
- Hayman-Reber, Madeline (12 February 2018). "Palm Island commemorates the centenary of the Bwgcolman people". NITV.
- "Palm Island". Government of Queensland. 21 March 2018. Text may have been copied from this source, which is available under a Attribution 4.0 International (CC BY 4.0) licence.
- "Palm Island (Bwgcolman)". Indigenous.gov.au. Government of Australia. 12 September 2017.
- The Manbarra People and Great Barrier Reef Marine Park Authority [2004] AATA 268 (15 March 2004), Administrative Appeals Tribunal
- Watson, Joanne (2010). Palm Island: Through a Long Lens. Aboriginal Studies Press. ISBN 978-0-855-75703-8.
