= Orpheus Island National Park =

National park in Australia

- IUCN category II (national park)
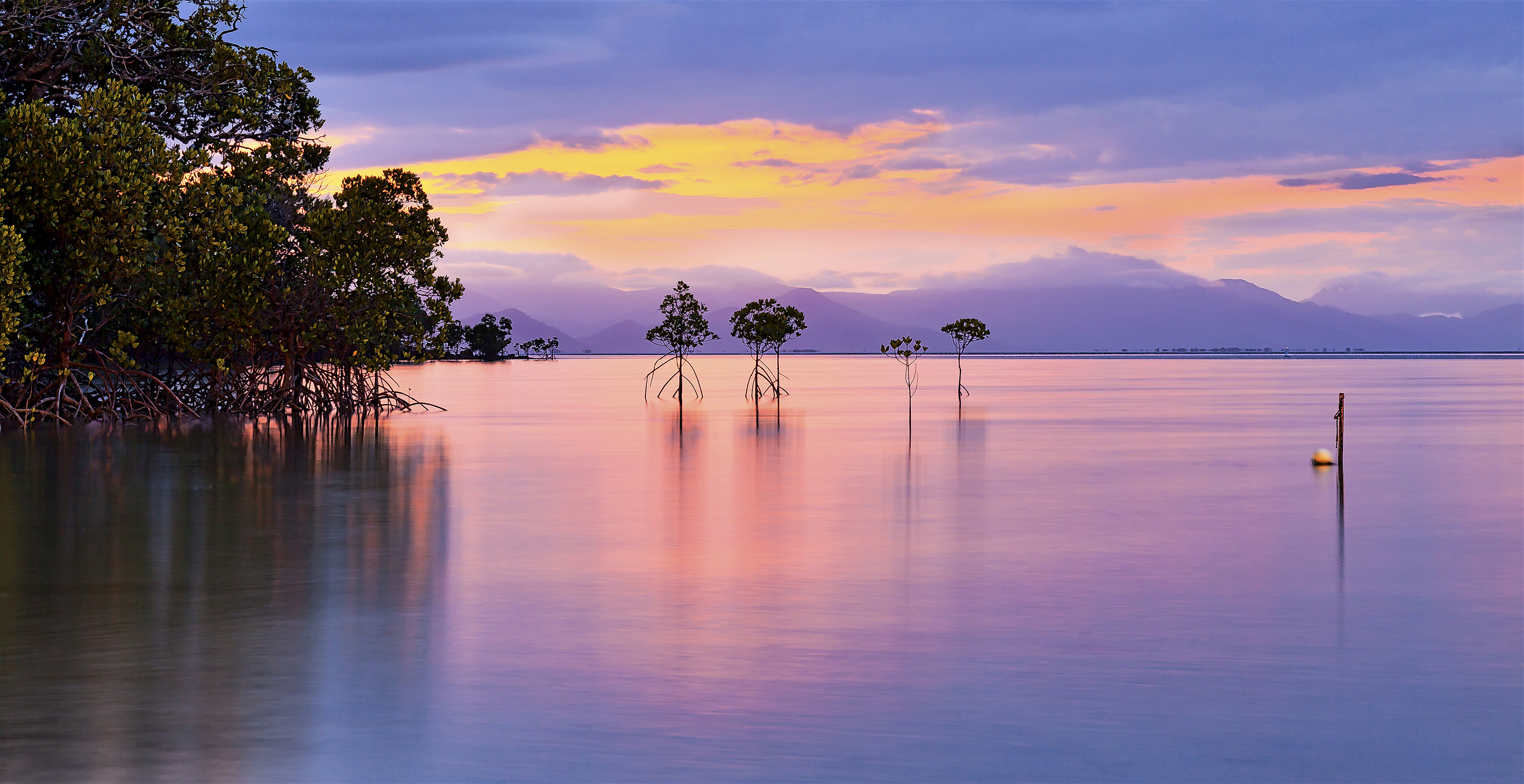
- Sunset at Orpheus Island National Park

- Location within Queensland
- Location: Queensland
- Nearest city: Ingham
- Coordinates: 18°37′06″S 146°29′37″E
- Area: 13 km^{2} (5.0 sq mi)
- Established: 1960
- Governing body: Queensland Parks and Wildlife Service
- Website: Official website

Orpheus Island National Park is a national park on Orpheus Island, in North Queensland, Australia. The Aboriginal (possibly Nyawaygi) name for the island is Goolboddi.

It is a continental island, and is one of the Palm Islands group, 1,189 km (739 mi) northwest of Brisbane, as is Pelorus Island 800 metres (2,600 ft) to the north. Both are in the Shire of Hinchinbrook. Besides Orpheus Island, the national park also includes Albino Rock, which lies 2.6 kilometres (1.6 mi) east of Great Palm Island (usually known as Palm Island).

Prior to the arrival of Europeans, Orpheus Island was inhabited by an Aboriginal people, probably the Nyawigi. The name "Orpheus" was given to the island in 1887 by Lieutenant G. E. Richards, referring to HMS Orpheus, a Royal Navy ship which was wrecked off the coast of New Zealand in 1863.

In 1960, it was declared a national park. In 2002, the island was bought by Jim Wilson, who had developed the Freycinet Lodge in Tasmania. In 2011, the island was sold to Chris Morris, the Computershare mogul.

A research station, operated by James Cook University, is located on the island. Since 2000, St Michael's Grammar School (of St Kilda, Victoria) has run a marine biology project there each June. Since 2018, Reef Ecologic has run an annual reef restoration and leadership workshop at the research station. The group published a research paper on findings from citizen scientists on a rare, large coral bommie at Orpheus Island in 2021 A citizen science database using iNaturalist has recorded over 700 observations of 334 species with the most observed species the Australian Green Tree Frog

There is also a luxury resort on the island, the Orpheus Island Great Barrier Reef Luxury Resort.

Great Palm Island is the closest location with government facilities.

== See also ==
- List of islands of Queensland
- Protected areas of Queensland
