= Fantome Island =

Island in Australia

Coordinates: 18°41′0″S 146°31′10″E

Native name: Eumilli
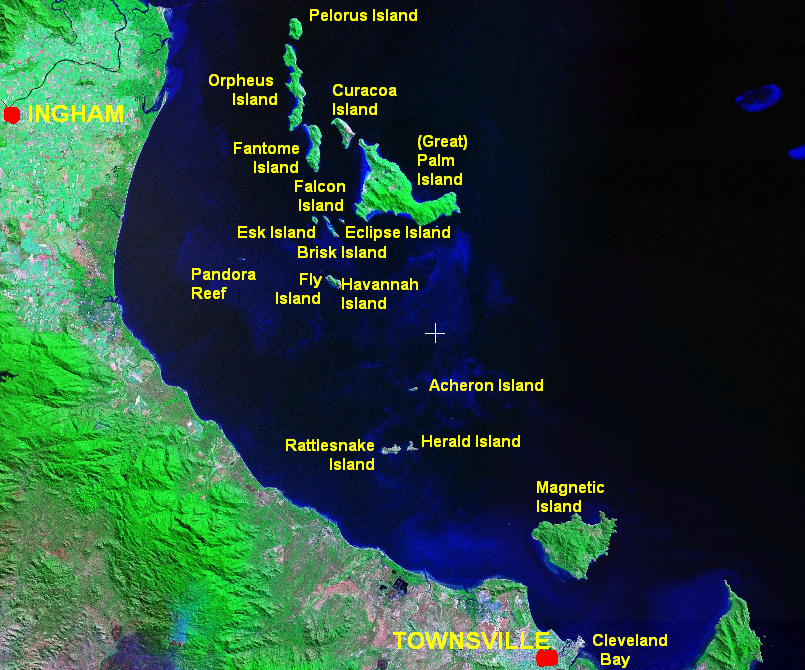

Geography
- Location: Coral Sea
- Archipelago: Palm Islands, Queensland
- Total islands: 10
- Major islands: Great Palm Island
- Area: 7.47 km^{2} (2.88 sq mi)

Administration
- Australia

Demographics
- Population: 0

Fantome Island is one of the islands in the Palm Island group. It is neighboured by Great Palm Island and is 65 km (40 mi) north-east of Townsville, Queensland on the east coast of Australia. The island is small with an area of 7.8 km^{2} (3.01 sq mi) and is surrounded by a fringing reef. The Djabugay (Aboriginal) name for this island is Eumilli Island.

The island is known for its 1928 lock hospital (for those with venereal disease) and 1939 leprosarium, known as the lazaret. Both are now heritage-listed on the Queensland Heritage Register, as Fantome Island Lock Hospital and Lazaret Sites. The island is no longer inhabited.

Along with nine of the other islands within the Palm Islands group, it falls under the local government area of the Aboriginal Shire of Palm Island.

== History ==
Fantome was gazetted as an Aboriginal reserve in 1925.

The Fantome Island Lock Hospital for the treatment of Aboriginal people with venereal diseases was established on Fantome Island in 1928. The Franciscan Missionaries of Mary took over the running of the hospital in 1939. This institution closed in 1945. In 1940 a leprosarium was established on the island; upon its closure in 1973, it was purged by fire. The island is the site of 200 graves.

In 1926 a lock hospital was built on Fantome Island; Aboriginal people were sent there mainly for treatment of sexually transmitted diseases. In 1936 Fantome Island became a medical clearing station where people sent to Palm Island were examined and treated if necessary. A leprosarium was established on Fantome in 1939. After World War II the hospital was closed, and by 1965 only the leprosarium remained on Fantome Island; it was administered by a Roman Catholic nursing order until 1973, when the inhabitants were moved to Palm Island. The administrators had complete and unaccountable control over the lives of residents. Punishments included the shaving of the girls' heads.

In 1907, a leprosarium to house all Queensland patients with leprosy was established on Peel Island in Moreton Bay near Brisbane. In 1940, the Indigenous patients were transferred from Peel Island to Fantome Island, under police escort and in conditions of great secrecy. The numbers of people admitted to Peel Island fluctuated during the mid-1920s and rose to 47 new cases in 1928. Although no new cases were reported in 1929 the reason might have been the secrecy with which this whole issue was managed by the Queensland Health authorities and the inability of the health regime to locate and track down the source of infection. This was not a simple problem and it persisted well into the next decade.

The head of the Australian Institute of Tropical Medicine, Dr Raphael Cilento endeavoured to describe the problem in one of his reports. He wrote that when the Kuranda reserve started in 1914, the majority of the Aboriginal people brought there belonged to the Djabugay language group, a closely knit group. There were a few others from as far north as the Gulf region and some from Mossman, and a large number had been born in fringe-camps and had grown up close to white settlement knowing no other life. The first case of leprosy reported among Aboriginal people in the region "was an old woman, Nellie, who died in 1916". She was avoided by other locals. She had no known descendants at the settlement.

In 1932, Cilento described his vision for Fantome:

The whole (local)population should be worked through Fantome & then regraded into new cases, incurable aged, incurable young & part cured & thence drafted when clean back into Palm from which they can be sent out into the mainland to be (1) assimilated if white enough; (2) employed under supervision & protection; or (3) kept on Palm as minor officials or peasant proprietors working personal strips around a collective farm.

In June 1975, the two existing reserves became a single reserve for official purposes, under the control of the Aboriginal and Island Affairs Department. In 1986 this was rescinded, and Fantome Island was transferred to the Palm Island Community Council by a Deed of Grant in Trust (DOGIT).

=== Heritage listing ===
The sites of both institutions were listed on the Queensland Heritage Register on 8 June 2012.

== Geography ==
The island, one of the Palm Islands group, is about 65 km (40 mi) north-east of Townsville, off the Queensland coast. Its area is about 7.8 km^{2} (3.01 sq mi) and it is surrounded by a fringing reef.

== Governance and people ==
The island is under the administration of the Palm Island Aboriginal Shire Council. Along with nine of the other islands within the Palm Islands group, it falls under the local government area of the Aboriginal Shire of Palm Island.

It is as of 2020 uninhabited, but people from (Great) Palm Island make regular visits to Fantome to fish and perhaps camp occasionally.

The Djagubay (an Aboriginal language) name for this island is Eumilli Island. The Manbarra language (also known as Wulgurukaba), of the Manbarra people, is a language of the region.

== Documentary film ==
A feature-length documentary film, Fantome Island, was released in 2011, made by Sean Gilligan and co-produced by Adrian Strong. It follows the story of former patient Joe Eggmolesse, a Kanaka (Pacific Islander) man who had spent 10 years there as a child and who returns to the island for a special Remembrance Day as a 73-year-old. The historical background of racist policies practised by the Queensland government and certain individuals is narrated and shown. The film was shown in the 2011 Brisbane Film Festival and went on to win two awards, the 2012 John Oxley Memory Award by the State Library of Queensland, and Best Australian Documentary at the 2012 Human Rights Arts & Film Festival. The film has also been shown on NITV and SBS on Demand.

== Graves at risk ==
The 120 marked graves are as of 2020 endangered by tidal erosion, with the risk heightened by a combination of factors: their location, the soil structure, vegetation encroachment, and climate change.

== See also ==
- 1930 Palm Island tragedy
- List of islands of Queensland
