= Opala =

Opala may refer to:

- Opala volcano, a stratovolcano located in the southern part of Kamchatka Peninsula, Russia
- Opala, Democratic Republic of the Congo, a territory in the Tshopo Province of the Democratic Republic of the Congo
- Chevrolet Opala, a mid-size car sold by General Motors do Brasil from 1969 to 1992
- Opala (surname)
