= Fantome Island Lock Hospital and Lazaret Sites =

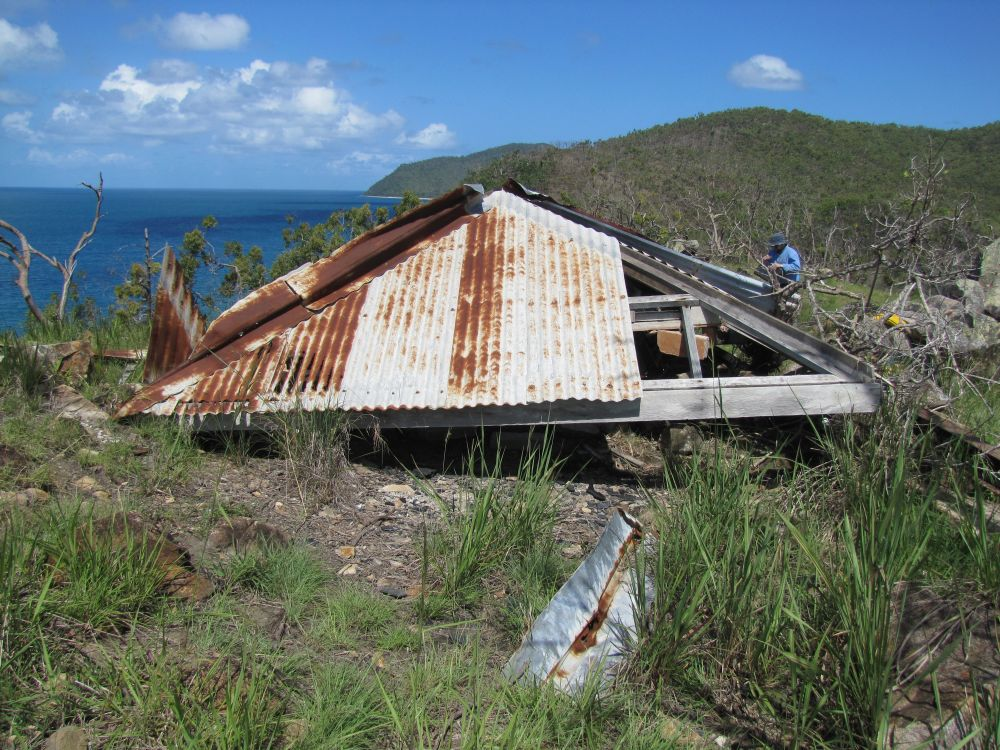
- Collapsed signal hut at Fantome Island, 2011

- Location within Queensland Location within Australia
- 18.687°S 146.5159°E
- Location: Fantome Island, Palm Island, Aboriginal Shire of Palm Island, Queensland, Australia

History
- Design period: 1919 - 1930s (interwar period)
- Built: 1926-1945

Queensland Heritage Register
- Official name: Fantome Island Lock Hospital and Lazaret Sites (former)
- Type: state heritage (built, archaeological, landscape)
- Designated: 8 June 2012
- Reference no.: 602798
- Significant period: Lock Hospital (1928-45); Lazaret (1939-73)
- Significant components: artefact field, grave surrounds/railings, burial/grave, dam/reservoir, tank stand, pathway/walkway, slab/s - concrete, wall/s - stockade/pallisade, tank - water, building foundations/ruins, artefact field, track, grave marker, well, flagpole/flagstaff, grotto, building foundations/ruins, tank - water, pump, hut/shack, cemetery, pathway/walkway, slab/s - concrete, tank - storage
- Builders: Queensland Government

Fantome Island Lock Hospital and Lazaret Sites is a heritage-listed former leper colony at Fantome Island, one of the Palm Island group in the Aboriginal Shire of Palm Island, Queensland, Australia. It was built from 1926 to 1945 by Queensland Government. It was added to the Queensland Heritage Register on 8 June 2012.

== History ==
Fantome Island, located north of Townsville approximately 22 kilometres (14 mi) off the coast of Queensland near Ingham and 6.5 kilometres (4.0 mi) north-west of Palm Island in the Great Palm group of islands, was the site of a lock hospital between 1928 and 1945 and a lazaret (or leprosarium) between 1939 and 1973. Both facilities were used for the isolation of Aboriginal, Torres Strait Islander and South Sea Islander patients or inmates. The archaeological remnants on the island are representative of the responses of former Queensland governments to the public health issues of sexually transmitted infections (STIs, previously known as venereal diseases, or VD) and Hansen's disease (leprosy) as they affected Aboriginal, Torres Strait Islander and South Sea Islander people. The island has a long history as a site of segregation and as an example of the working of the Aboriginal Protection Acts.

In February 1925 the Home Secretary's Department proposed a lock hospital on Fantome Island in conjunction with the (Great) Palm Island Aboriginal reserve. The traditional owners of Fantome Island (also known as Emulli) are the Manbarra people, while those removed from elsewhere in Queensland to Palm and Fantome islands are known as the Bwgcolman people. Fantome Island was declared a Reserve for the use of the Aboriginal Inhabitants of the State (R.297, or Reserve 3771) in the Queensland Government Gazette of 17 October 1925. The trustees were the Under Secretary of the Home Department (WJ Gall) and the Chief Protector of Aboriginals (JW Bleakley). Prior to this Fantome had been held as Occupation License 297 and there was a small area of cleared land at its northern end. Apart from a well, fires had destroyed any other infrastructure and the island was unoccupied by 1925.

A lock hospital enforced isolation to prevent the spread of STIs. In 1868 the Queensland Government enacted the Prevention of Contagious Diseases Act 1868, which enforced the compulsory examination of prostitutes for STIs and their housing in the Brisbane lock hospital at Herston until "cured". Failure to submit to these requirements was a jailable offence.

During the first decade of the 20th century a number of developments in the diagnosis and treatment of STIs occurred. In 1905 the cause of syphilis (Treponema pallidum) was identified. In the following year the Wassermann test for identification of the syphilis infection was created. From 1909 the Wassermann test was used at Queensland's public health laboratories, while the first effective treatment (Salvarsan) was developed in 1910.

These steps coincided with an increase in the incidence of syphilis and gonorrhoea in Australia, and with increased public awareness of this rise. New health legislation - the Health Act (Consolidated) 1911 - required compulsory notification of cases to the Commissioner of Public Health; prohibited treatment by unqualified persons; provided free treatment, irrespective of condition or gender; distributed advice leaflets; and enabled compulsory examination, and segregation where necessary, of persons of either gender known or suspected to be suffering from STIs and liable to convey them to others.

The idea of creating island lock hospitals for Aboriginal people with STIs arose in the first decade of the 20th century. During 1908 the first island lock hospital for Australian Aboriginal people was established in Western Australia on the islands of Dorre and Bernier. In Queensland, Aboriginal STI patients were initially sent to Aboriginal reserves, including Barambah, and White Cliffs on Fraser Island, but planning for the establishment of an island-based lock hospital in Queensland for Aboriginal people commenced in 1914. The Chief Protector of Aboriginals' Office proposed constructing such a facility due to the belief that isolation was the best method of managing STIs in Aboriginal people. Initially, a facility was planned for Fitzroy Island near Cairns, but World War I disrupted this scheme and it never went ahead.

This concept of isolation and control of Aboriginal people was already accepted as Queensland's method of dealing with the Aboriginal population. In 1895 Archibald Meston provided the Queensland Government with a plan for the welfare and protection of the colony's Aboriginal people. Meston contended the reason earlier reserves operated by missionaries and others had been unsuccessful all over Australia was poor management. Further, the locations of such places were ill-suited for agriculture (to allow adequate food production) and had not adequately isolated Aboriginal people in a way that prevented their exposure to vices and diseases brought by contact with European people. Meston ultimately recommended the establishment of three reserves to serve southern, central and northern Queensland; the appointment of a Chief Protector (Meston later became one of two regional Protectors, under a Protector for all districts); and stronger government control.

Meston's proposals, and their influence in shaping subsequent legislation and its administration, marked a significant change both in Queensland and Australia in government control over Aboriginal people. Meston's recommendations were brought to fruition in the Aboriginals Protection and Restriction of the Sale of Opium Act 1897, the provisions of which gave the government substantial control over many aspects of the lives of Aboriginal people and extended its authority to establish reserves, to which they were forcibly removed.

Superintendents were in charge of these places (a title also given to those in charge of missions), and were responsible to the Chief Protector of Aboriginals. The realities of "living under the Act" were to profoundly impact upon the lives of Queensland's Aboriginal people.

Settlements at Durundur (near Woodford, c.1897), Whitula (near Windorah) in western Queensland (briefly in operation in response to the 1902 drought) and Fraser Island (1897) were beset by a range of problems and did not last, with the latter experiencing a very high death rate among inmates. From 1905 the Barambah Aboriginal Settlement (from 1934 called Cherbourg) in the South Burnett, first established in 1901, came under complete government control and operation. The Taroom Aboriginal Settlement was established in 1911.

By segregating Aboriginal people from the rest of the community, the removals process was highly effective in fulfilling the government's objectives of increased control and regulation of the state's Aboriginal people, enforced on settlements through a range of administrative and disciplinary measures. While humanitarian concerns were used as a justification for removal by advocates of the reserve system, Aboriginal people were forcibly removed for a wider range of reasons including illness; lack of employability or refusal to work; old age; as punishment; and after a jail sentence had been served.

Aboriginal people were removed to Fantome Island under the Aboriginals Protection and Restriction of the Sale of Opium Act 1897, unlike European STI patients who were detained on the mainland under health legislation. This was despite the fact that none of the three main STIs - gonorrhoea, syphilis and the less common ulcerative granuloma - could be easily diagnosed by the methods available at the time. Bacteriological testing was not applied to non-European suspected STI cases; clinical diagnosis was deemed sufficient. The tropical disease of yaws, which caused skin lesions and produced a positive Wasserman reaction, could also be mistaken for syphilis. Not only were some people sent to lock hospitals unnecessarily, those that were actually infected had little chance of a cure until antibiotic therapy became available in the 1940s. Penicillin was introduced for the treatment of gonorrhoea in 1943 but was only generally available from 1944.

The Protection of Aboriginals and Restriction of the Sale of Opium Amendment Act 1934 extended the provisions of the 1897 Act and the powers of the Chief Protector. It enabled compulsory medical examinations, and also allowed for "uncontrollable" Aboriginal people or "half-castes" (the definition of this term was changed to include South Sea Islander people) to be sent to an institution. The latter enabled the incarceration of people at the Fantome Island lock hospital for non-medical reasons.

With policies of isolation and control for both STI patients and Aboriginal people already established in Queensland by the 1920s, the construction of a lock hospital on Fantome Island proceeded. By June 1927 there were three Aboriginal settlements in Queensland under direct Home Department supervision: Barambah, Woorabinda (replacing Taroom during 1927), and Palm Island, plus 11 mission stations. The Palm Island settlement had opened in 1918 after a cyclone destroyed the Hull River settlement (established 1914) on the mainland. The primary reason for the government's decision to establish a lock hospital at Fantome Island was its close proximity to Palm Island. This allowed the medical officer on Palm Island to also treat the Fantome Island inmates.

A 66,000-imperial-gallon (300,000 L; 79,000 US gal) water reservoir was completed behind (west of) the lock hospital site, which was located at the narrow, central portion of Fantome Island, facing Curacoa Channel, by November 1926. However, a cyclone in February 1927 caused serious damage, delaying the completion of the hospital's other buildings by Palm Island workers.

The lock hospital was completed and equipped by December 1927 and the first patients arrived in early 1928. Frank Hambleton Julian, who lacked medical training, was the wardsman. Dr CR Maitland Pattison was the visiting medical superintendent, and buildings included male and female wards, irrigation chambers, laundries, "native officials" cottages, wardsman's quarters, a store and kitchens. A vegetable garden was cultivated to supplement food supplies and provide "some light occupation for the convalescents". The sea also provided additions to the diet, including fish, crabs, oysters and turtles.

An influx of patients resulted in the approval of extensions and additions to the lock hospital in 1931, and two cases of suspected Hansen's disease were also tested and found to be positive. During 1932 a number of cases of STI and Hansen's disease contacts were sent to Fantome Island for observation after Dr Raphael West Cilento, the Federal Director of the Division of Tropical Hygiene for Queensland, had inspected coastal camps between Townsville and Cairns and on the Atherton Tablelands. In 1934 Cilento became Director-General of Health and Medical Services within Queensland's Department of Health and Home Affairs (DHHA); a position he held until 1946. He was knighted in 1935 and later wrote Queensland's official centennial history "Triumph in the Tropics".

During 1932 the number of patients in the lock hospital increased from 73 to 156, with 128 men, women and children admitted, four births, four escapes and 17 discharged. However, the year had a high death rate amongst patients - 28 people, representing 13.65% of the total population under treatment.

The number of patients at Fantome Island continued to increase as a result of the government policy of isolating STI cases, as well as the policy of removing Aboriginal people to reserves. Palm Island went a step further than other reserves by removing people from the mainland. In 1933 Cilento reported that the health of Aboriginal people in North Queensland was poor and that they were undernourished. Cilento believed that mainland Aboriginal people living near towns would be better off on Palm Island (and by extension Fantome Island), where their health could be improved before being returned to the mainland for assimilation into the general community. Cilento also sought to have any "coloured" people living under "native" conditions under the control of the Chief Protector of Aboriginals, as he viewed such groups as a health threat.

By December 1933 there were 227 patients on Fantome Island, and a village had been established for elderly married chronic STI patients at the northern end of the island, on a flat area adjacent to the beach, in huts with grass walls and iron roofs.

Around this time, the government expected those patients who had some savings to contribute to the cost of their treatment on Fantome Island, even though European STI patients in Australia were not charged. The idea was mentioned in December 1931 by the Chief Protector of Aboriginals (Bleakley) and in April 1932 money was withheld from the estate of a deceased patient. By March 1933 approval was given by Bleakley to charge those with sufficient funds two shillings per day, but this practice appears to have stopped in early 1941.

In another cost-saving measure, the lock hospital attempted to achieve self sufficiency in food production, reflecting the earlier view of Meston that the first duty of reserves was "that they be self-supporting institutions". By 1934 there were 40 patients dispersed in villages, and these were being fenced, along with agricultural land. Three acres of upland rice was planted, and horses and pigs were brought to Fantome Island. A Catholic Church was also erected. On the 13 September 1934 Wardsman Julian was appointed deputy superintendent (under the superintendent on Palm Island) in charge of the lock hospital on Fantome Island, and he stayed in this position until 1945.

By 1935 there were over 60 people living in two farm villages at the north end of the island, and a timber Anglican Church (St Martin's) was under construction on the western side of the island near the hospital. The water scheme for the hospital now included a windmill (later replaced by a pump in 1937) supplying the 1926 reservoir, and a pump supplying a 10,000 imperial gallons (45,000 L; 12,000 US gal) galvanised iron concreted tank near the northern farm villages. The first rice crop had failed, but the dairy herd continued to increase.

Despite the building programme the death rate for the lock hospital's patients remained high. Between 1935 and 1939 the monthly total of patients at the lock hospital, taking into account admissions, discharges, births and deaths, fluctuated between 186 and 276, while the death rate ranged between zero and six patients a month during this period. Causes of death recorded included tuberculosis, chronic VD, pneumonia, influenza and heart disease.

In 1936 vegetables and fruit trees were being grown on the island. That year, as well as admitting patients from Palm Island and elsewhere in Queensland, Fantome Island became the health clearing station (quarantine station) for all those being sent to Palm Island.

By September 1938 the northern area of Fantome Island was under consideration as a tubercular settlement, while a leper settlement was proposed for nearby Curacoa Island. A map of Fantome Island at this time indicated that "farm villages" (for chronic STI cases) existed along the western side of the northern point of the island, and an early 1939 map included two villages roughly where the lazaret male and female compounds were later built; and a "vegetable growing area" at the east end of the small valley just south of the 10,000-imperial-gallon (45,000 L; 12,000 US gal) water tank.

The search for a lazaret site in northern Queensland followed a succession of other attempts to segregate Hansen's disease patients. The first case of Hansen's disease in Queensland had been discovered in 1855. During the following two decades there were isolated cases identified mainly amongst Chinese and South Sea Islander people and the patients were either isolated on coastal islands or returned to their homelands. The disease sparked little interest until the 1880s when there was a notable increase in awareness of it, despite the lack of an increase in cases.

In 1889 a leprosarium was established on Dayman Island in the Torres Strait for the reception of non-European lepers, principally Chinese people. In conjunction with ongoing Australian fears about non-European migrants, and a perceived association of Hansen's disease with non-Europeans, Chinese and South Sea Islander people in particular were blamed as a source of the disease. The Dayman Island facility, which abandoned patients to their own devices, closed after the enacting of the Leprosy Act 1892, which was prompted by the diagnosis of the first European with Hansen's disease in 1891.

The 1892 Act, among other things, allowed the establishment of lazarets, required the reporting of Hansen's disease where it was suspected and permitted the removal of a patient to, and detention in, a lazaret. As a result, two new lazarets were established: one on Stradbroke Island south-east of Dunwich for male European patients, with a building of 14 bedrooms by 1895; the other on Friday Island in the Torres Strait for non-Europeans, with four corrugated iron huts for patients and two cottages. Both lazarets experienced considerable difficulties and in the early 1900s the government decided to close them and establish a multi-ethnic lazaret on Peel Island.

Peel Island had briefly been used to house Queensland's first female European with Hansen's disease, between 1896 and 1898. The new lazaret on Peel Island, opened in 1907, was designed and organised on the principle of isolation. Patients were housed in individual huts grouped in three separate compounds - male, female and "coloured". The huts for European patients were small single roomed, timber buildings, while the huts for the non-European patients were more rudimentary structures of bush timber clad with tea tree bark. The durability of the bark cladding was short-lived, and in 1909 the huts were reclad with corrugated galvanised iron.

However, the Queensland Government eventually abandoned the idea of housing non-European patients on Peel Island. By January 1939 several suspected Hansen's disease cases from Thursday Island and Cooktown had been sent to Fantome Island, while further cases were present on Palm Island. In March 1939 the farm village area of Fantome Island was chosen for the lazaret site, instead of Curacoa Island, after a visit to the Palm Island group by Cilento and Bleakley. Also present were Deputy Superintendent Julian; Dr Geoffry Charles Palliser Courtney, Medical Superintendent of Palm Island; and Dr Graham Croll, a Hansen' disease research investigation officer appointed under a Commonwealth grant. Julian was given control of the lazaret, and the Commonwealth provided £1000 to build a laboratory for inquiry into Hansen's disease amongst Aboriginal people.

Cilento had been pushing for a segregated lazaret from the early 1930s. In March 1939 he stated that the non-European patients on Peel Island could readily be transferred to Fantome Island, with a considerable saving in annual costs to the government for their care. He pointed out that treating an Aboriginal leper at Peel Island cost about £70 per annum; whereas this could be reduced to £12-£15 at Palm (Fantome) Island. He also noted that the difficulty of finding staff willing to work with Hansen's disease or STI patients could be dealt with by using nuns from the nursing branch of a religious body. However, rather than focusing on monetary savings, Cilento's public argument for moving non-European Hansen's disease patients from Peel Island to a segregated lazaret on Fantome Island was that a majority of the patients in question were from North Queensland, and had been moved away from their relatives to a colder climate. He stated that Ned Hanlon, the Minister of Health, had decided to move them to a suitable spot closer to their "tribal associations".

The site for the lazaret and laboratory already possessed a reticulated water supply, and the grass huts of the chronic STI cases could provide accommodation for 60 people (the previous occupants were later moved to Wallaby Point on Palm Island).

Tentative arrangements had been made to construct huts, set on concrete floors with fibrolite walls and galvanised iron roofs, for the Hansen's disease patients by 20 March 1939. Fantome Island was declared a lazaret in May 1939, and thereby came under Cilento's control, under section 51 of the Health Act 1937. This Act allowed Cilento as Director-General of Health and Medical Services to force the detention in a lazaret of people with Hansen's disease. The proposed lazaret was intended to include a laboratory with offices and wards, quarters for four sisters of a religious sisterhood, a European wardsman and Palm Island staff, plus huts for 100 patients, with kitchen, store and dining buildings and lavatories. By 21 September 1939 twelve huts were erected, with six already occupied by Hansen's disease patients from North Queensland.

In December 1939 the laboratory was completed, but the hospital ward building was not. That month the media reported that four young nuns of the Australian Missionary Order (Our Lady Help of Christians) in New South Wales had arrived at Peel Island, and would later accompany "black" patients from that location to Fantome Island, leaving 26 "white lepers" on Peel. Home Secretary Hanlon stated that improvements could then be made for the white patients, "which obviously could not be undertaken while mixed races were there".

The Order of Our Lady Help of Christians (OLHC) had been established in 1931, and had already undertaken work on Palm Island. The nuns sent to Fantome Island comprised Mother Peter, and Sisters Agnes, Bernadette and Catherine, who undertook some medical training in Sydney, before receiving training in the treatment of Hansen's disease on Peel Island.

On 10 January 1940, 49 Aboriginal patients from Peel Island arrived on Fantome Island to join the 26 local patients already there. They had left Peel Island early on 8 January, been towed on the Dunwich barge to Pinkenba, and then travelled by rail in sleeper carriages to Cardwell, arriving at 3.40am 10 January, before travelling by boat to Fantome Island that day.

They were accompanied by three policemen, plus a wardsman and Matron Avonia O'Brien from Peel Island. In March 1940 O'Brien wrote a report on the trip north, in which she notes she clashed with Julian over feeding the patients after arrival and also over unloading the train. In addition, she complained that the food at Fantome Island was "of the very poorest class", with very rough corned beef, potatoes, onions, rice, tea, sugar, oatmeal and very bad bread, initially "supplied very sparingly". She claimed the patients did not receive any greens from the time they arrived until she left the island on 3 March 1940. The four nuns had arrived in Townsville on 13 February and they stayed with the Sisters of Mercy at the Strand Convent before travelling to Fantome Island on 1 March 1940.

Although Julian admitted that there were difficulties in obtaining fruit, green vegetables and fresh milk, he insinuated that the Peel Island patients had been treated too well previously and had become fussy. Dr Charles Arthur Courtney, the acting Medical Superintendent, echoed this view, noting the patients were fed more than the usual government ration; that the North Queensland leprosy patients who had been on Fantome Island since 1939 had never complained; and that a lot of food was wasted by the newcomers. Although the Department of Native Affairs was responsible for supplying the lazaret, Bleakley blamed the Health Department for not requesting a special diet for the Peel Island patients, as the lazaret was under the control of the latter department.

Meanwhile, the construction of facilities at the lazaret had continued. By February 1940, using Fantome Island labour, 24 huts were completed. These were divided into sections of six huts, each section with a sanitary block (two earth closets either side of a shower) and a combined kitchen/dining room. There were also two laundry blocks. A fifth section was commenced in February. Initially, male and female patients were not segregated, much to the nun's dismay, but later separate male and female compounds existed.

The timber-framed hospital wards at the lazaret were completed by the end of February 1940 and these were used as a residence by the nuns until their quarters were completed by the Department of Public Works in April. By May 1940 there were plans for a bath and change block, attached to the nuns' quarters by a covered way, and a kitchen and laundry addition to the south of the hospital wards.

Dr David William Johnson, the Medical Officer at Peel Island, visited Fantome in mid March 1940. He reported to Cilento that the diet was unsatisfactory for at least a month after arrival of the Peel Island patients, as the Palm Island authorities were unaware of importance of a good diet in the treatment of leprosy and poor weather prevented delivery of fresh produce. The 12 cows on Fantome Island were producing fresh milk for the lock hospital, but not the lazaret. Johnson also noted that Dr CA Courtney was not visiting Fantome Island regularly, partly owing to the weather, but he would visit weekly in future. However, Johnson noted that Courtney had no previous experience in leprosy, and further regular visits from medical officers were desirable. Tellingly, the standard Hansen's disease treatment of the time (chaulmoogra oil) had not been given to the patients since they left Peel Island.

Later in 1940 Dr Johnson and CD O'Brien, as Public Service Inspectors, reported that Dr CA Courtney was leaving the treatment of the lock hospital's patients in the hands of Julian and Matron Brumm; and that neither Dr CA Courtney, nor Dr GCP Courtney before him, had filled out the paperwork required under the Health Act 1937, regarding notification of STIs.

Whether through poor diet or lack of medical attention, the patients at the lazaret suffered a high death rate during 1940. After the death of one patient there were 74 patients at the new lazaret by 6 February 1940; 41 male and 33 female. In March 1940 O'Brien inferred that the two deaths to that date were due to the food issue, and by 12 December 1940 a total of 14 lazaret patients had died that calendar year. It has been claimed that 40 former Peel Island patients died in the first five years of the Fantome Island Lazaret, from Tuberculosis. The official death toll at the Fantome Island Lazaret between 10 January 1940 and 30 June 1943 is 31, although the number of patients on the island was maintained with new admissions. The Annual Report on the Health and Medical Services of the State of Queensland for the year 1964 listed 49 deaths at the Fantome Island Lazaret for the years 1940 to 1945 inclusive.

Total deaths at the lock hospital were even higher than those at the lazaret. At the lock hospital during 1940, 162 patients were admitted for treatment; 184 were discharged cured, 34 died and 198 were still under treatment at the end of the year. In the period between 1940 and 1945, the lock hospital's population ranged between 190 and 214 patients. The high death rate at the lazaret and lock hospital means that many people living on Palm Island have at least one family member buried on Fantome Island.

In August 1940 Cilento complained to the Under Secretary of the DHHA (CE Chuter) about the "very grave deficiency in medical attention" at both Peel Island and Fantome Island. Cilento claimed that there was a lack of knowledge about leprosy amongst the staff on Fantome Island, since Dr Croll's services had ended due to illness, and Dr Geoffry Courtney had been called up. Further training of the nuns had thus far not occurred. Cilento even claimed that having Julian (now officially appointed Superintendent of the lazaret) in charge, given his lack of experience with leprosy, was both "ridiculous" and "illegal".

While Cilento was unhappy with the lack of medical expertise on Fantome Island, water was another ongoing cause for concern. By October 1940 the water supply for the lock hospital was from two wells. The water supply at the lazaret involved water being pumped from a well on the edge of a low-lying flat, up to the galvanised iron storage tank, and then gravitated to the lazaret. Whenever drought conditions occurred on the island, water supplies ran very low, and this problem continued into the 1950s.

Along with efforts to meet the patients' physical needs, attempts were made to meet their spiritual needs. Foundations were laid for a weatherboard and fibro cement Anglican Church at the lazaret in October 1940, and St Lukes opened in January 1941. A Catholic church and presbytery at the lazaret, first approved in 1940, were proceeded with from mid 1944.

During April 1941 houses for married couples employed at the lazaret were under construction (four were built, located east of the nuns' quarters) and Julian recommended a similar design for married staff at the lock hospital (three were built by mid 1942).

The Fantome Island Lock Hospital was transferred within the DHHA from the Department of Native Affairs to the Department of Public Health in June 1941. Earlier that year, after a medical survey of the lock hospital, Dr Johnson had discovered that the majority of the inmates showed no signs of STIs, and a number were discharged.

To reflect the dual use of Fantome Island, in September 1941 it was divided into two reserves. The northern portion became R.435 (Reserve 7117), a Reserve for Health Purposes (for "the reception and medical treatment of lepers"); while the central and southern portion became R.436 (Reserve 7118), a Reserve for Health Purposes, (for "the medical treatment of Aboriginals suffering from venereal disease").

Development in the northern part of the island proceeded, and in late 1941 plans were afoot for electric lighting at the lazaret. A sketch map from late 1941 included four sections of huts to the south, and two sections of huts to the north, in the patients' housing area. The Anglican Church was located adjacent to the southern set of huts.

The issue of the marriage of patients at the lazaret was discussed in October 1944, and it was stated that any babies would need to be immediately removed from their mothers to avoid infection. Marriages between Hansen's disease patients were allowed in 1946. By early 1945, it was also policy not to allow children of patients to visit the lazaret, and any other visitors (two per month per patient) were not allowed into the lazaret proper, having to meet the patients at the rear of the hospital, under strict no-contact guidelines.

Due to internal church politics, the OLHC nuns on Fantome were replaced in December 1944, when seven nuns of the Order of Franciscan Missionaries of Mary (FMM) arrived, six from Canada and one from Malta. Two were qualified nursing sisters and one a pharmacist. Two of the nuns were trained in dentistry during 1945, in a six-week course on Fantome Island, by the retired former superintendent of Brisbane Dental Hospital, CC Vidgen.

By March 1945 many buildings on Fantome Island urgently required repair. However, the lock hospital had outlived its usefulness. An inspection of the facility by Dr GS Hayes in early 1945 discovered that most of the suspected gonorrhoea patients tested had clean smears, and therefore had been cured; and in addition some had never had gonorrhoea. Dr Hayes stated that suspect cases were sent to Fantome Island from various settlements (the majority from Cherbourg), and were treated as if they had gonorrhoea, whether they did or not. The syphilis cases were mostly in a non-infectious stage, and could be returned to the settlements, with weekly injections. Hayes believed that suspect cases could be isolated and treated on the mainland, as there was no STI specialist to evaluate the cases as they arrived on Fantome Island. Upon the closure of the Fantome Island Lock Hospital on 31 August 1945, 13 patients were transferred to the existing hospital on Palm Island, and some buildings were later removed to Palm Island for a new lock hospital and other purposes. Julian's role on Fantome Island ended at this point.

In November 1945 six patients at the lazaret were selected as working men and received their first wages, while five women were assigned to cook in the five kitchens, also on wages. That same month two men took charge of the cows, with horses put at their disposal, and three patients were assigned as uniformed policemen. Patients who had unapproved contact with members of the opposite sex were sometimes locked in the hospital or confined to their huts under guard.

After World War II there was a burst of building activity at the Fantome Island Lazaret. In 1946 funds were allocated for a septic system and additions to the nuns' quarters, a septic system for the hospital, a new school, new island telephone system and a new well. By October 1946 a visitors' quarters was under construction and another 10,000-imperial-gallon (45,000 L; 12,000 US gal) water tank was provided by June 1947. By June 1948 radio communication with Palm Island was installed, along with a 16 mm movie plant for entertainment of the patients.

The women's huts at the lazaret were in a bad condition after the war, notwithstanding the poor design of all of the 1939–40 patients' huts. By September 1946 there were 38 women in 15 huts, when there were supposed to be two people per hut. The skillion-roofed 12-by-15-foot (3.7 by 4.6 m) huts were also uninhabitable in heavy rain. As the wall framing was on the outside of the fibro sheeting, water easily penetrated the structures. The concrete floors were also rough and breaking up.

New externally-sheeted two-room 12-by-20-foot (3.7 by 6.1 m) huts with verandahs on two sides, some with an attached bathroom, were recommended by the nuns and the Superintendent of Palm Island, Mr Sturgess. The District Supervisor of Works in Townsville for the Department of Public Works, M McAndrew, supported the new design and considered the current huts, which had no verandahs and became ovens in the sun, to be very unsuitable. "After all, these unfortunates are human beings and entitled to a reasonable standard of comforts the same as whites". A total of 27 huts of the new design, including six for married couples, were approved by Cabinet in June 1947. However, as the Superintendent of Palm Island said he lacked skilled labour, and the Department of Public Works claimed it was unable to find European labour willing to go to Fantome Island, by November 1949 a decision was made to repair the old huts instead.

Although attempts to improve patient accommodation on Fantome Island failed, medical advances were occurring in the treatment of Hansen's disease. The drug sulphetrone was introduced at Fantome Island in December 1948 in the treatment of 40 selected cases. Sulphone drugs such as dapsone and sulphetrone had side effects including anaemia, gastro-intestinal complaints and "dapsone syndrome" which could include dizziness, nausea, swelling of limbs and face, nodules under the skin and shivering attacks. However, in most cases the drugs worked. In July 1949 it was reported that sulphetrone had "already resulted in a remarkable improvement among patients" on Fantome Island.

There were 63 patients on Fantome Island in October 1949, and with the introduction of the new treatments, the death rate fell and discharges increased. There had only been three discharges of Hansen's disease patients from Fantome Island from 1940 the end of 1948; compared to 22 discharges from 1949 to the end of 1952. In March 1950 Abraham Fryberg, Cilento's successor as Director-General of Health and Medical Services, recommended that Peel Island patients be moved to the mainland, and Queensland's Premier, Ned Hanlon, noted that the disease of leprosy would now be known as Hansen's disease.

About the same time that Hansen's disease patients were finally receiving effective treatment, there was increased public pressure to end the policy of isolation. Fantome Island was singled out by the Australian Leprosy Campaign Committee. In 1950 their publicity officer, FG Gladen, claimed that the history of management of the disease in Queensland was "one long record of neglect, indifference and departmental ineptitude". He stated that Fantome Island had no permanent medical officer, clinical records had never been kept, adequate medicine stocks were not maintained and there were no surgical, X-ray or pathology facilities. He added that the diet was so bad that patients were unable to assimilate the meagre medical treatment given. Gladen also claimed that administrative neglect on Fantome Island had resulted in 80 deaths in 10 years and only five cures. His claims about clinical records and diet were rejected by the DHHA, which stated that Gladen had never visited Fantome Island.

Another organisation critical of the treatment of Fantome Island patients was the Relatives and Friends Association. Dedicated to improving the rights and conditions of patients with Hansen's disease, the Association became particularly active around 1950, donating packages of food, toys and other items to the patients, writing letters to the Queensland Government demanding better lazaret conditions or an end to isolation, and publishing a newsletter, the Moreton Star.

In April 1951 the population of the Fantome Island Lazaret was 70 patients and six nuns. EH Hinton, the Honorary Secretary of the Relatives and Friends Association, visited Fantome Island on 12 December 1951. In a report on his visit he dismissed claims of mistreatment and beatings, and noted that there was plenty of good food and hospital equipment, and the patients were well dressed; but he criticised the design of the patients' huts and the fact that the Medical Officer only visited once a fortnight. Although he praised the nuns for their work, he also pointed out that there was no occupational therapy; and the rate of pay the patients received for their work on the island - 7/6 per week - was insufficient. He concluded that the facility should be moved to Kenmore near Brisbane. In response to the last suggestion, Fryberg stated "It is obvious that Mr Hinton does not know anything about aboriginals because if they were on the mainland, even though they were five or six hundred miles away from their homes, they would soon find their way back. Isolation on an island is the only sure way".

In May 1953 Hinton and the Relatives and Friends Association presented Fryberg and the Director of Native Affairs with a list of complaints made by patients of Fantome Island, alleging a lack of supervision of cooking, no treatment on Sundays or public holidays, overly strict supervision of visits by friends and relatives (two hours every three months), sick patients being neglected in their huts, and a "work or starve" regime. Dr Gabriel, Acting Medical Superintendent, denied the accusations, although he did note that the visiting situation could be improved.

Gabriel had visited Fantome Island in April 1953, when he noted that sulphetrone was working well for most patients, although he recommended that the dose be doubled. However, some patients had an intolerance to the drug. He recommended trialling some patients on dapsone, and others on thioacetazone. He stated that all patients were in a good state of nutrition, but there was a need for more potatoes, fresh greens, and fresh milk. Activities included weekly picture shows in an open-air theatre, occasional concerts (including a concert party from Palm Island), plus fishing, boating, gardening, poultry farming, and preparing exhibits (hand crafts) for the Fantome Island Show.

At the time of Gabriel's visit, there were 67 patients on Fantome Island (22 female), along with six nuns, a Mr H Stewart (Department of Native Affairs, in charge of stores, police, buildings and technical issues), and 12 workers from Palm Island. Daily dressings occurred at the dressing stations in each compound, and the medical superintendent from Palm Island visited for three hours every Wednesday. However, as this officer changed every eight weeks, Gabriel stated that there was no time for any one Medical Officer to become "even superficially conversant with the specific Sulphone or other treatment for Hansen's disease". There were 10 women in the female compound, and 35 men and 10 married couples in the male compound. Another married couple, Wilfred and Rachael Obah, lived in a cottage built by Wilfred's father (known as "Obah's Corner Hut") on the foreshore south of the lazaret.

The ceilings of the huts were still unlined at the time of Gabriel's visit, with recently renewed roofs. They had one door and six windows with flap-type shutters, and Gabriel requested that they be ceiled and have their floors repaired. Although they were not waterproof, were very hot in summer and very cold in winter, the single-skin walls apparently reduced cockroach infestations. He claimed that "housing, diet, hygiene and conditions generally were infinitely superior [to Palm Island] on Fantome Island and I am not surprised that the patients at Fantome are not anxious to be discharged to Palm Island". Other reasons that patients eligible for discharge remained on Fantome Island included ulcers on their feet; their spouses not being eligible for discharge; having nowhere to go; or no means of continued therapy at their place of discharge.

Gabriel also had to dodge patient's questions about equal treatment. "Much information was sought from me concerning the white patients at Peel Island? I replied as truthfully as I could without drawing attention to the rather different requirement of white and coloured patients". He was also asked whether, if the Peel Island patients were moved to the mainland, the Fantome Island patients would also be moved; his answer was that he knew of no such intention.

In the meantime, patient facilities were upgraded during the 1950s. Two Braithwaite pressed steel 100,000 imperial gallons (450,000 L; 120,000 US gal) (454,609 litre) water tanks were erected, on concrete bases, over 1951–52. An electrical system was close to completion by June 1953, at which time there were 60 patients. Lighting and power points were installed in the buildings during 1951, electricity poles and street lights were also erected and diesel-powered generating sets for DC current were installed in a powerhouse. Converters had to be brought in to provide AC power to the picture theatre, radio telephone and public address system.

A radio telephone was installed on Fantome Island by June 1955, when the number of patients had decreased to 36, and patient numbers had fallen to 26 by 1956. At this time a home for ex-Hansen's disease patients was being built on Palm Island. By 1958 it was accepted that Hansen's disease patients could be released from isolation without risk to the community after three consecutive negative monthly smears. The European patients at Peel Island were moved to the new Princess Alexandra Hospital in Brisbane in 1959; yet 22 patients remained on Fantome Island. Although the success of Sulphetrone drugs in treating Hansen's disease led to hopes in the early 1950s that Fantome Island could close, this did not occur until 1973.

The delay in closing the Fantome Island Lazaret prompted Dr Gabriel, in September 1965, to recommend to the Director-General of Health and Medical Services that the Fantome Island patients be moved to an isolation ward at the Princess Alexandra Hospital. "In view of the fact that completely new legislation has been enacted to give aborigines and Torres Strait Islanders equal status [with Europeans] it may well become increasingly difficult to justify different isolation areas and different discharge conditions for white and coloured Hansen's disease patients'. He added that some of the active cases on Fantome Island were eligible for immediate discharge - assuming the conditions applied to Europeans were used.

There were other issues on Fantome Island in the late 1960s, at least according to Reverend Maurice Malone, who lived at the lazaret. He complained to the Department of Aboriginal and Island Affairs about supplies and mail not being delivered from Palm Island, delays in repairing refrigeration units, a lack of a morgue, a lack of water in the two large water tanks, and wild bulls frightening the nuns, who rarely left the island. He also claimed that some visiting nuns were refused a boat ride to Fantome Island from Palm Island. The nuns distanced themselves from Father Malone's claims about a campaign of persecution and "bureaucratic sadism" by Palm Island officials, and he had been removed from Fantome Island by March 1969. The Director of the Department of Aboriginal and Island Affairs, PJ Killoran, suggested that Father Malone's complaints were due to his "medical condition".

Meanwhile, by 1969 the electricity system at the lazaret needed rewiring and conversion to AC supply to power the modern appliances the patients hoped to use, such as electric guitars and television sets. The huts, which by now had caneite ceilings, were suffering from rot and white ants. However, the cost of fixing the system, or replacing the whole complex, was seen as prohibitive, especially since all special hospitals for Hansen's disease had been phased out by 1970, and there was no medical reason to rebuild at Fantome. However, it was claimed that some former patients were staying on as staff on Fantome Island to avoid the temptations of alcohol.

On 5 October 1970 the Queensland cabinet decided to close the Fantome Island facility once there was alternative accommodation on Palm Island. It was argued that Fantome Island had outlived its usefulness, as continuous dosage with sulphone drugs for three months or more rendered the vast majority of Hansen's disease patients non-infectious. At this time there were 12 patients on Fantome Island, including nine readmissions.

A report by Medical Superintendent David Bowler in February 1971 criticised the state of the buildings on Fantome Island and the lack of any training or rehabilitation programme for patients, and claimed that "the problem of Fantome Island is social and definitely not medical". Bowler argued that, with regard to the treatment of patients as individuals, Fantome Island was a disgrace.

The Fantome Island facility did not last much longer. A six-bed isolation ward was built at the Palm Island Hospital by mid 1973, by which time there were three nuns, five patients and two ex patients still at Fantome. The patients were reportedly reluctant to move, as they feared a loss of freedom on Palm Island. However, the lazaret closed on 3 August 1973 and in mid August the complex was burnt by the Health Department. In October 1973 the Bishop of Townsville reported that the former Catholic Church and some other buildings were still standing and were being used by visitors to the island, and requested that they be burnt by the Department of Aboriginal and Island Affairs; but vandalism had apparently achieved this aim by November 1973. The two large Braithwaite steel water tanks were disassembled in 1974 and taken to Townsville.

In June 1975 the two existing reserves on Fantome Island, R.435 and R.436, became R.722 (Reserve 15826), a Reserve for Departmental and Official Purposes under control of the Aboriginal and Island Affairs Department. In 1986 R.722 was rescinded and Fantome Island was transferred to the Palm Island Aboriginal Council by a Deed of Grant in Trust. The island is currently uninhabited, although there is some evidence of recent camping. Palm Islanders make regular visits to the island to fish.

== Description ==
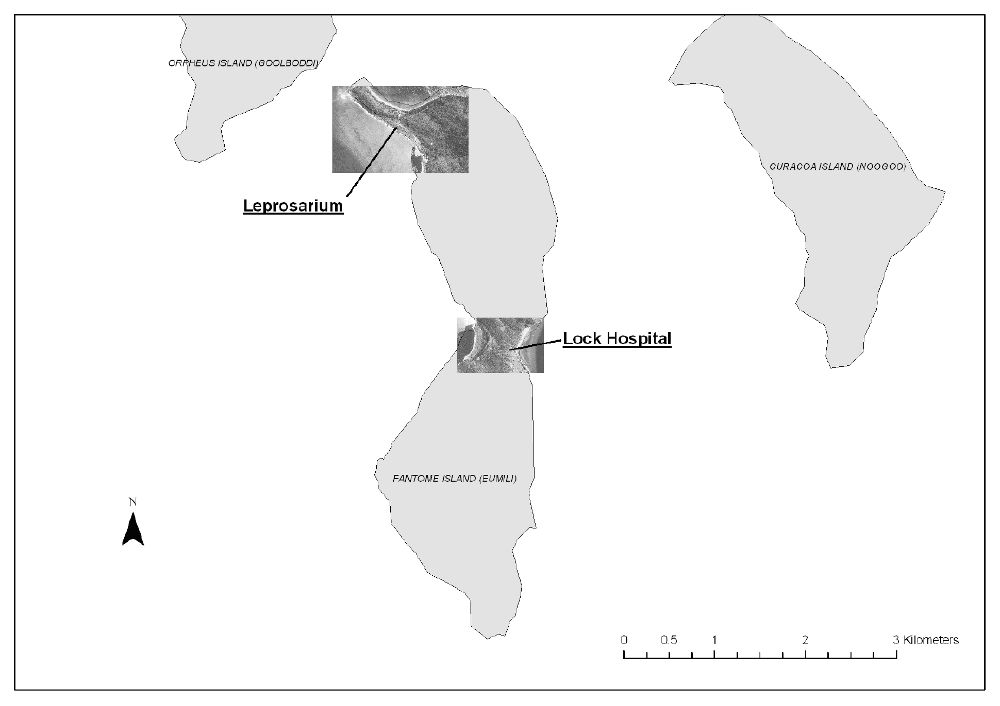
Map showing the lazaret was in the north of the island and the lock hospital in the centre, 2012

Fantome Island, also known by its Aboriginal name of Eumilli, is one of 13 islands that form part of the Great Palm Island group. It has an area of just 7.8 square kilometres (3.0 sq mi). It is located 65 kilometres (40 mi) north-north-west of Townsville. The historical occupation of the site is centred on two sections of the island - the lazaret is located on the low-lying coastal areas at the northern end of the Island; and the lock hospital site is located 3 kilometres (1.9 mi) south-east of the lazaret, at the centre of the Island. The archaeological remains of the sites have been interpreted according to historical research conducted prior to the site visit.

=== Lazaret ===
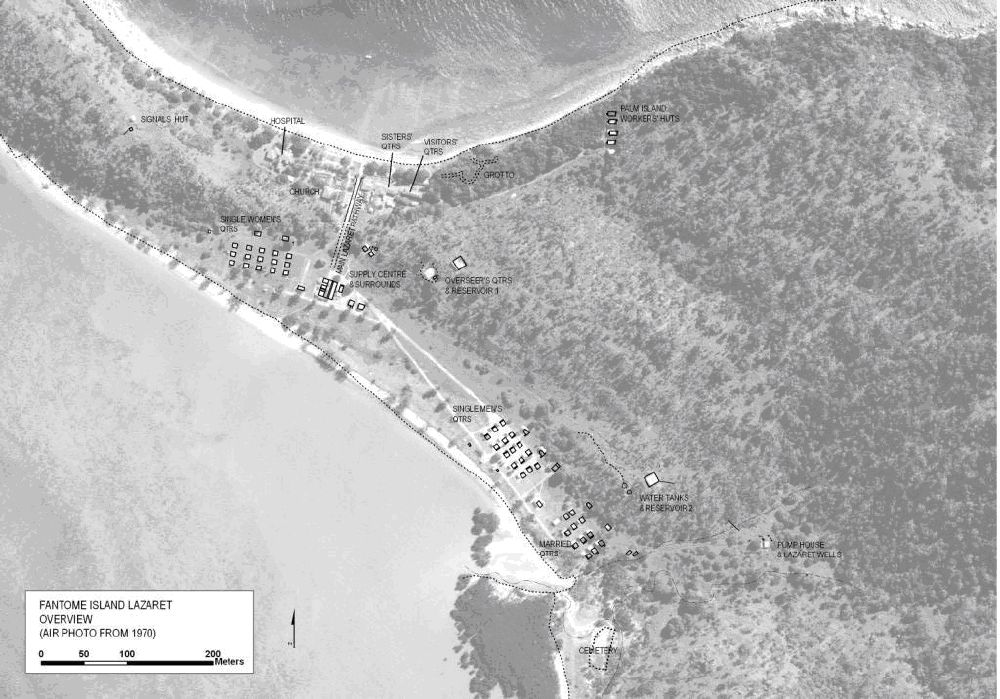
Map showing layout of the lazaret, 2012

The remains of the lazaret are located on the low-lying coastal areas on the south-west and north-eastern sides of the northern peninsula of the island. The two sides of the low saddle area are connected by the main lazaret pathway. The north-eastern side of the low saddle contains the remains of the administrative buildings: such as the church, presbytery, hospital, sisters' quarters, visitors' quarters and grotto. On the south-west side of the saddle are the women's, men's and married couples' quarters, the supply centre and surrounds (including the open air cinema, sewing room and butcher), school house, dispensaries and cemetery (the most southern site of the lazaret complex). On the hill north of the men's quarters are the remains of two reservoirs and the overseer's house.

==== Main Lazaret Pathway ====
A pathway traverses the island in the low saddle area of the lazaret. It is 5 metres (16 ft) wide and commences at the edge of the northern beach, extending in a south-south-west direction for 120 metres (390 ft).

==== Church ====
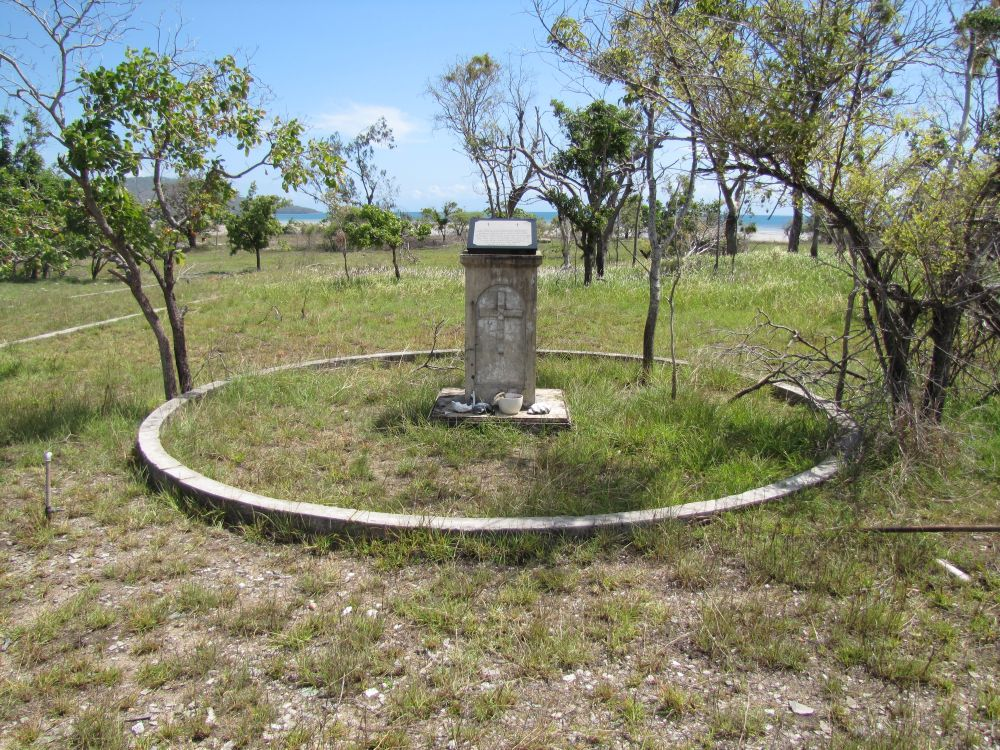
Plinth behind St Mary's Catholic Church, 2011

The remains of St Mary's Catholic Church are located adjacent to and immediately west of the main lazaret pathway. The remains include a large concrete pad. A low wall with a small square recessed section on the outer side, presumably for the placement of a plaque, is located on the end of the pad. In line with and south of the church building pad is a circular concrete feature with a rectangular plinth at its centre. The plinth features a shallow arched recess on each side with a Christian cross motif. A recent plaque sits on the plinth and is dated 31 May 2010. It commemorates the patients, Sisters of Our Lady Mary of Christians Franciscan Missionaries of Mary, and staff that lived, worked and died on Fantome Island.

Presbytery Immediately west of the church remnants are the scattered remains of the presbytery. Little survives except one timber building stump, a concrete step at the western and southern ends of the site and a small concrete pad with septic access grate. The site also contains a scatter of demolition rubble including asbestos fibro fragments, corrugated galvanised iron (CGI) sheets, metal louver frames, and metal ant caps. An overgrown garden of exotic flowering plants is on the western side of the presbytery. Behind the presbytery and extending up the gentle slope to the adjacent ridge is a light scatter of artefacts, including the remains of a porcelain urinal or toilet, an in situ septic downpipe, and numerous glass bottles and fragments.

==== Hospital ====
The remains of the lazaret hospital are located 53 metres (174 ft) west of the main lazaret pathway. The beginning of the complex is marked by a low dry stone and coral wall extending perpendicular to the beach front. The remains of the hospital buildings include: numerous timber building stumps and a rectangular concrete pad which was part of the hospital's septic system. Two concrete sets of stairs survive - one set climbs to the north, suggesting that these were rear access stairs to the hospital complex and the second set is located towards the far west of the hospital complex and climbs to the east to a position that closely corresponds with the known location of the laboratory. At the rear of the hospital complex are two concrete pads. One pad contains the remains of a stove, fridge, and concrete wash tub. These pads are possibly remnants of the hospital laundry and medical sample collection site. The area is covered by building debris particularly asbestos fibro fragments. Fragmented iron bed frames are located across the site.

==== Sisters' Quarters ====
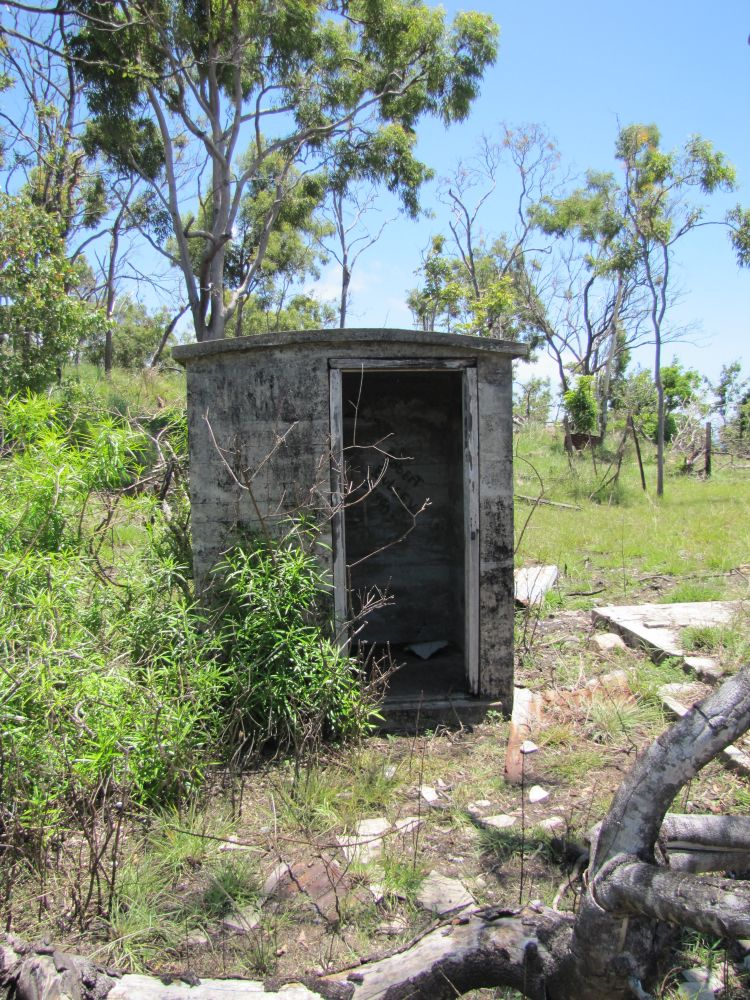
Possible fumigation locker at rear of the Sisters' quarters, 2011

The remains of the sisters' quarters are situated parallel to the north beach front and immediately east of the main lazaret pathway. An extensive scatter of building rubble is found across the site, particularly asbestos fibro fragment, CGI sheets, galvanised iron, steel pipes, and some bricks. The most intact remains are those associated with the nuns' changing rooms. The site is marked by a concrete pad which is recessed into the ground, with raised concrete surrounds. Internal spaces can be read through the presence of the bases of room dividers, marked by concrete strips. Two iron bath tubs are situated side by side in the centre of the floor area. Adjacent to and east of the changing rooms pad, is a CGI water tank and timber stumps representing a collapsed tank stand. An iron pipe runs from this tank and parallel to the beach front towards a second set of concrete pads. These pads contain the remains of an iron stove and system of concrete spoon drains. Their location set back from the access track and behind another, since-removed building suggests an ancillary use such as a kitchen or laundry.

A small solid roofed structure constructed entirely of cement is located adjacent to these remains. It has a doorway (the door itself is missing) but no windows. Its function is unclear but internal wall markings suggest use as either a meat locker/safe or possibly a fumigation shed.

==== Visitors' Quarters ====
The remains of the visitors' quarters are located immediately east of the sisters' quarters. Little remains of this building except for a large scatter of demolition rubble containing significant amounts of asbestos fibro and metal pipes and fittings. A set of three concrete stairs survives leading up into what was once the western end of the former structure. Also evident are three timber building stumps, a rectangular concrete block with septic access grate, an iron bath tub and two CGI water tanks to the east of the visitors' quarters.

==== Grotto ====
Located east of the visitors' quarters are the remains of the grotto. The grotto is accessed by a stone-lined path that leads off the main path in front of the remains of the visitors' quarters. The grotto contains a large shrine consisting of a tall mound of local stone. The shrine features a statuary platform close to the apex though a statue is no longer present. Adjacent to and to the north-west is a concrete altar. The face of the altar is marked with three arched shallow recesses. The largest central arch features a rough outline of Australia that has been constructed of small shells applied to the surface. The path to the grotto terminates at the site of a small steep pyramid-shaped shrine constructed of stone. The shrine has a flat concreted top section probably for a statue, though a statue is no longer present.

==== Palm Island Workers' Huts ====
Located 180 metres (590 ft) east of the grotto are the four concrete platforms aligned north–south at the base of a slope. All of the concrete platforms are of similar dimensions and built upon a mound of local stone. Each platform features a set of 3–4 steps on its western end and a small square extension to the rear where there are the remains of iron stoves and cooking implements (tin kettle, bowls and pans). Adjacent to and to the rear of each platform are the remains of water pipes and tap connections. The platforms are covered in building debris, with fragments of asbestos fibro and some CGI sheets and the remains of iron bed frames. Behind all the platforms are artefact scatters of metal (mostly iron) cooking implements and equipment and some glass bottles and fragments, some dating from the mid-20th century.

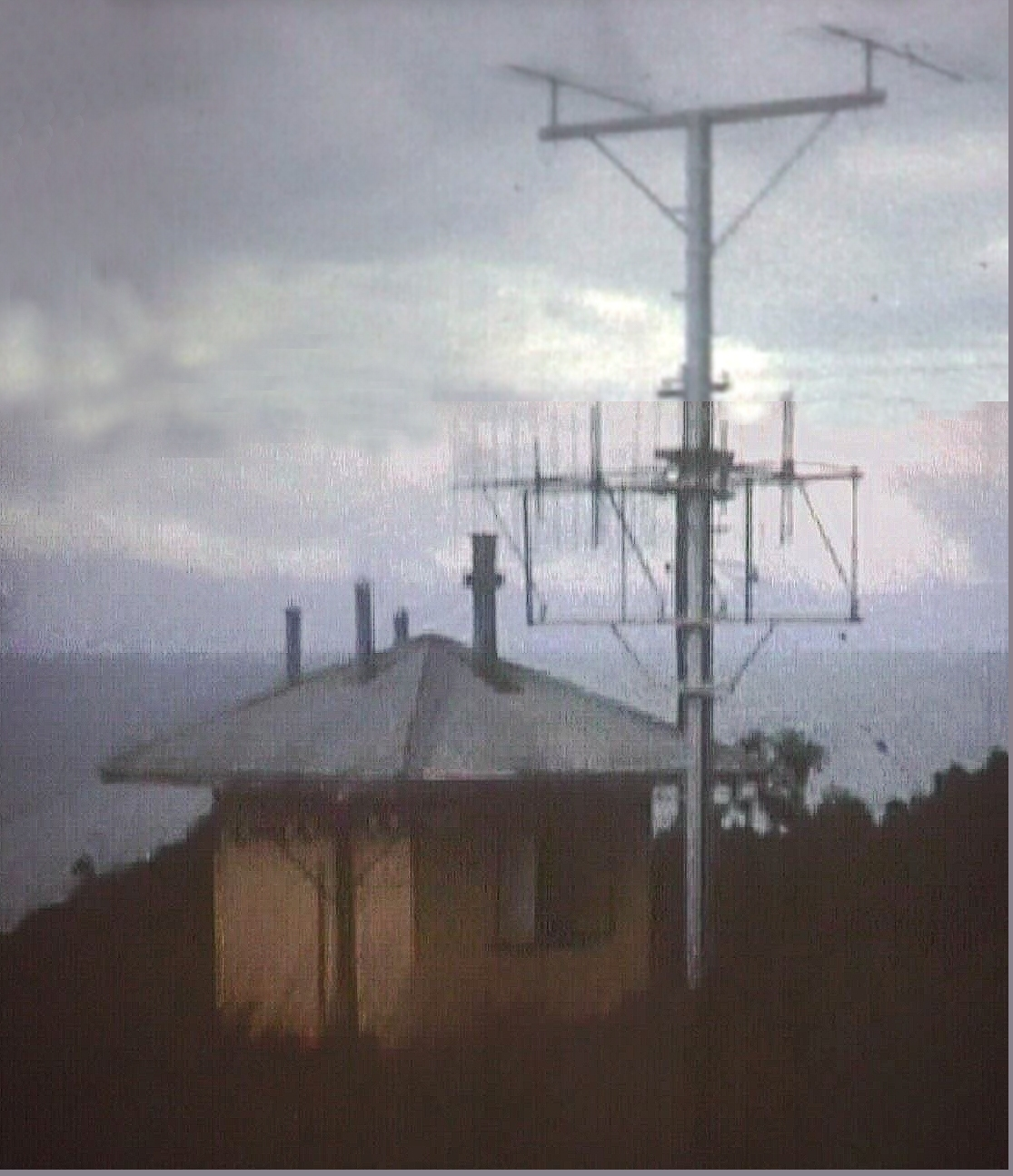
Signal hut Fantome Island, 1968

==== Signal Hut ====
Located 275 metres (902 ft) west-north-west of the main lazaret pathway, close to the crest of the hill which overlooks the lazaret from the north-west, are the remains of a timber-framed signal hut. The walls and roof have fallen onto the concrete pad floor. The roof, although collapsed, is largely intact. It is a timber-framed pyramid sheeted with CGI on two sides. Positioned immediately down slope to the south-west of the hut lies an iron "I" beam which was a radio mast. Surrounding the hut and the mast are scatters of artefacts including numerous large black Dunlop brand batteries, CGI sheets, white ceramic fragments, timber posts, wire cable, window glass, and window latches. Extending down the ridgeline from the hut to the main lazaret pathway are collapsed telephone line poles. The hut housed a small petrol generator to charge a set of batteries and a rack holding a single channel radio-telephone to Palm Island. Palm Island had in turn a three-channel radio link to Townsville. The equipment at the Townsville end was in ex-WW2 pill-boxes on Castle Hill.

==== Single Women's Quarters ====
Located on the south-west side of the northern peninsula of Fantome Island, and to the south-west of the main lazaret pathway, are the remains of the single women's quarters. The site consists of concrete pads of former huts, communal kitchens, dispensary, toilet and shower blocks, and laundry. There are five rows of concrete pads representing individual huts, with three pads per row (a total of 15 huts). The pads are rectangular in shape and are roughly the same size of 5 by 6 metres (16 ft × 20 ft). The pads have markings indicating a 1-metre (3 ft 3 in) wide open veranda on one side with an outwardly sloping floor. The veranda is oriented to the south- east or the north-west alternately so that verandas face each other. The pad has an edge lip of varying width defining the position of the former walls. Low density artefact scatters are associated with each hut. According to an oral history of a former patient, the most westerly hut in the single women's quarters was later modified for use as a "lock-up" for women patients. There are pads relating to two communal kitchens. Both are situated at the northern ends of the huts and between two rows. At the north end of kitchen 1 and kitchen 2 are projections which suggest the location of a stove or oven. Additional features of note include a track leading to the single men's quarters from the north-west and the nearby supply centre. Located 30 metres (98 ft) west of the last row of hut pads are the remains of a pit toilet.

==== Supply Centre and Surrounds ====
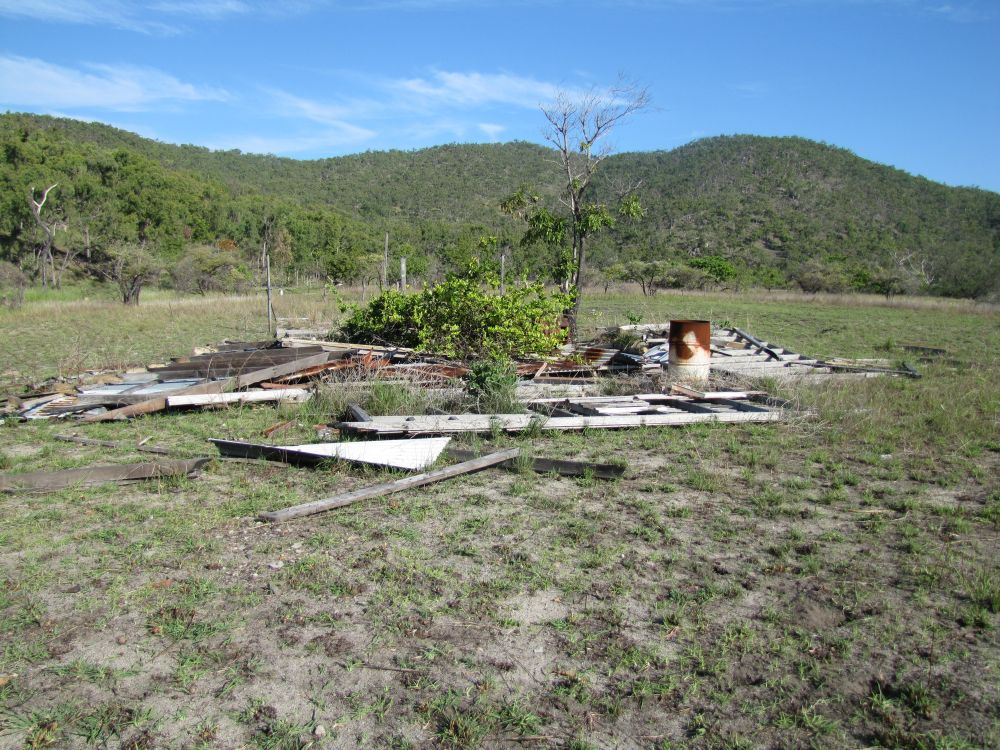
Collapsed school house, 2011

Located at the southern end of the main lazaret pathway are the remains of multiple structures that comprised the supply centre for the lazaret. The supply centre complex consists of a cluster of attached concrete pads comprising: office and store, sewing room, oil room, butcher, and open-air cinema (between the sewing room and the office/store). Immediately east of this complex are the remains of a vehicle garage. Remnants include a concrete pad with a short ramp on the northern end. East of the garage are the remains of the lazaret's school. The building collapsed in 2011. The remains include a concrete pad covered in rubble, timber framework, CGI sheeting and a 44-imperial-gallon (200 L; 53 US gal) metal drum. These remains have been partially burnt. A concrete wash tub and basin is located on the eastern side of the pad. Abandoned and partially deconstructed machinery (generator) is bolted to school building pad. East of the school are the remnants of a recreation hut, comprising a concrete pad with four timber posts. The pad is surrounded by a scatter of CGI sheets and building rubble.

==== Palm Island Workers' Dining Hut ====
Fifty metres north-east of the supply centre complex is a largely extant timber-framed structure on a stone and concrete pad. The walls are clad with CGI sheets. The northern wall has two awning windows. The southern wall has one timber-framed window. The remains of a small set of steps made from local stone and mortared with concrete is located on the south-east corner of the pad. A makeshift stone fireplace has been constructed in the lean-to with a reused iron stove top. The eastern wall of the structure is missing, as is part of the roof structure at that end and almost all of the CGI roof sheets.

Adjacent to the Palm Island workers' dining hut is a concrete pad representing an old generator room. In the north-east corner of the pad is a smaller raised concrete pad with six mounting bolts embedded around the edges and adjacent is a concrete tank stand base.

==== Overseer's Quarters ====
The remains of the overseer's quarters are located on steep, rocky ground immediately north of the single men's quarters and the supply centre. The remains include a dense scatter of building rubble, including bricks, CGI sheets, two inch steel water pipe, iron bath tub, sink, and two iron bed frames. A small levelled concrete pad is located to the rear of the building rubble and next to the iron bath tub.

==== Reservoir 1 ====
The remains of a reservoir are located immediately to the northeast the overseer's quarters. Remains include a rectangular concrete pad with metal framing. Artefacts include piping, bolts and screws. A substantial section of hill face has been cut to create a level platform with a sloping concrete retaining wall measuring over two metres high in the highest corner. A CGI scatter is found to the west of the pad.

==== Water Tanks and Reservoir 2 ====
The remains of a second reservoir and two water storage tanks are located on steep, rocky ground above the single men's quarters and supply centre and east of the overseer's quarters. The reservoir consists of a rectangular concrete pad with collapsed metal framing on site. Artefacts include bolts and screws. Pipes are visible along the exposed corner of the concrete pad. The hill face has been cut to create a level platform. Features in this area include the remains of a track and tramway leading up the hill, two large water storage tanks (south-west of reservoir 2) and a stone-lined path leading down the hill away from the two storage tanks.

==== Single Men's Quarters ====
The single men's quarters are located on generally flat and cleared land to the south-east of the single women's quarters and the supply centre complex. A track leads to the single men's quarters from the north-west and the nearby supply centre. The area is bordered by a steep rocky slope to the north-east and a sandy beach to the south- west. The site consists of concrete pads of the single men's quarters, communal kitchens, dispensary, toilet and shower blocks, laundry and Anglican Church.

There are five rows of concrete pads representing individual huts, with three pads per row (a total of 15 huts). The pads in the single men's quarters are of the same configuration of those in the single women's quarters. Low density artefact scatters are associated with each hut. Within the single men's quarters are pads relating to two communal kitchens. The partial remains of kitchen 1 are a concrete pad and a concrete path located on the south-west corner, leading away towards the huts. At the north end of the kitchen is a projection of the pad with the remains of a stove. Kitchen 2 is similar to kitchen 1. It has the remains of a path to the single men's huts that crosses a small gully and the north end of the pad also has a pad projection. There is a modern rubbish dump behind kitchen 2.

The Anglican Church remains comprise a rectangular concrete pad with entry steps. The slightly elevated north-east end of this pad (originally holding the altar) has a small rectangular CGI shed constructed after the lazaret occupation. Immediately adjacent to the church pad is a platform floor made from concrete pavers. More recent domestic rubbish and materials scattered about the site suggest the paved platform is the location of a post-lazaret occupation camp site.

A concrete pad located between the single men's quarters and the married quarters and in front of the Anglican Church are the remains of a dispensary.

==== Married Quarters ====
The married quarters are located immediately adjacent to the single men's quarters and include huts, two communal kitchens (one later converted into accommodation), a garden area, cess pits, a midden, and general laundry buildings. Former structures are marked by concrete pads. At least five huts in this section may have been occupied by single patients and follow the same pattern as that seen in the other single patients sections. Generally, the hut pads in the married quarters differ from the single patient's hut pads by an extension of the pad for a personal kitchen. Each hut pad has an edge lip (of varying width) that runs three sides of the hut pad and along the inner side of the veranda (where they exist) but not on the outer side of the veranda. Iron bed frames are scattered in the area. A 35 sqm garden area is located behind the second, more southerly, kitchen. At the south-eastern extremity of the married quarters and adjacent to a tidal creek are two possible cess pits and two rectangular concrete pads (probably general laundry building remains). There is a midden on the creek bank which contains shells of clam and oyster, brown bottle debris, ceramic fragments, metal, and assorted domestic artefacts.

==== Pump House and Lazaret Well ====
East of the married quarters and 160 metres (520 ft) along a small creek line, are the remains of several wells and pumping equipment. The area includes four circular concrete wells, one rectangular timber-lined well, the remains of a single piston water pump, and a scatter of steel water pipes. Ten metres east of the timber-lined well are several concrete machine mounts though the machines have been removed.

==== Lazaret Cemetery ====
The cemetery is located on the southern bank of a tidal creek 60 metres (200 ft) from the married quarters. Positioned within a small bend of the creek, the cemetery is bordered by water to the north and east with resulting erosion problems, particularly at the northern end. The cemetery is marked on the east side by an incomplete line of timber fence posts. The individual graves are orientated east–west and are organised into six rows running north–south. The total number of marked graves is 120. Many of the graves are lined by stone surrounds, however, according to the oral history of a former patient these are possibly later additions and may not accurately reflect the number, size and/or location of all the graves. There are some timber crosses marking graves but none of the extant markers retain the name of the deceased; many of the timber crosses now also lack the horizontal member. A possible eroded grave is located east of the main concentration and is marked by a partial stone arrangement near the edge of the eroded creek bank. It is unclear if the site is an eroded grave but it is certainly in a quite separate and distinct area to the main concentration of graves. There is no evidence of human remains or a grave cut within the soil profile of the eroded bank.

==== Wilfred and Rachael Obah's Cottage ====
Located at the southern end of the mangrove zone and 200 metres (660 ft) south of the lazaret cemetery, are partial remains of a small structure, comprising a small section of fractured concrete pad and a small alignment of local stones to the west.

=== Lock Hospital ===
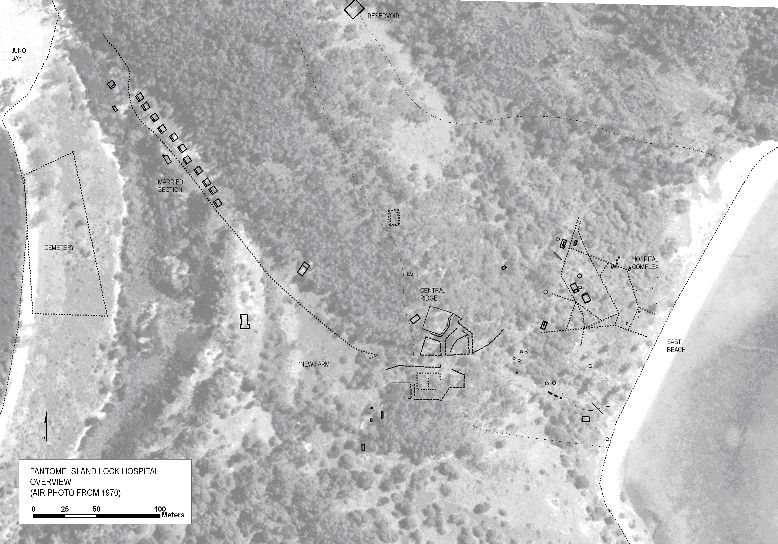
Map showing layout of the lock hospital, 2012

The lock hospital is located in the central part of the Island. Like the lazaret complex the remains of the lock hospital stretch across the two sides of the Island. The remains of the administrative complex, including the hospital itself, are located on the eastern side of the Island and adjacent to the eastern beach. Other elements, including living quarters and cemetery, are located on the western side adjacent to Juno Bay. The eastern and western elements are divided by a narrow ridge with a small saddle area allowing access across the site.

==== Hospital Complex/Eastern Beach ====
The hospital complex is located on the eastern beach area which comprises a low coastal flat with adjacent sandy beach. Physical evidence from this complex includes remnants of buildings, particularly concrete building pads of varying sizes, concrete spoon drains, timber stumps and CGI water tanks. A network of stone-lined pathways also criss-cross the area. Other notable features include a concrete plinth, an engine block base, brick furnace remnants and the remains of an iron oven and stove.

Bordered by the creek bank to the north, the beach to the east, and a stone-lined path to the south is a diffuse scatter of the remains of a large timber on stump building or series of buildings. This is believed to be the main hospital site. Adjacent to the path are five small concrete pads. To the north-east of these is a large area with a scatter of CGI sheets, broken ceramics, small medicine bottles, and other glass fragments including small glass ampoules.

Adjacent to the central beach area and south of the probable main hospital site is a triangular configuration of three small concrete blocks. One features an iron ring. These are located 12 metres (39 ft) apart and the arrangement suggests supports for a central flagpole or mast.

Located inland from the beach are the remains of a large timber on stumps building or complex of buildings. Archaeological evidence includes alignments of timber stumps and two concrete pads representing the bases of stairs. Two sections of 2-inch (51 mm) steel water pipe are also located immediately adjacent to and to the south-west of the building stumps, suggesting connection to a mains water supply. A large CGI water tank with concrete base is situated south of the stumps.

The extreme southern end of the eastern beach area features two small tidal creeks. At the mouth of one creek are the remnants of a small stone dam wall. The wall measures 8 metres (26 ft) in length and has been breached.

==== Central Ridge ====
The central ridge area is situated between the eastern beach and Juno Bay (western beach) sections of the lock hospital site. The area is a saddle ridge extending roughly north to south.

Archaeological features include a series of dry stone walls, the remains of the superintendent and assistant superintendent's quarters, a cairn, and a reinforced concrete reservoir.

The dry stone walls are constructed from local stone and form a complex configuration of pens and paths. The walls are separated into two sections (hereafter referred to as the northern and southern pens) by a track which crosses the lowest point of the saddle area and connects the two sides of the Island. The southern pens surround remnants of living quarters and include low stone alignments outlining former structures and pathways. Small rock garden beds, collapsed timber posts, a septic pipe, an oven and stove are located within this enclosure. Two oven features are also identifiable. The northern pens are flanked by the track to the south and a cutting into the hill face for a platform. The stone walls are approximately 1.3 metres (4 ft 3 in) in thickness and 1 metre (3 ft 3 in) in height across the area.

Located immediately to the north-west and adjacent to the northern dry stone wall pens, is a concrete pad. These are possibly the remnants of the assistant superintendent's quarters.

A cairn of unknown origin is located 30 metres (98 ft) north-north-west of the assistant superintendent's quarters. The feature is marked by a rectangular arrangement of stones measuring 4.2 by 2.0 metres (13.8 ft × 6.6 ft).

A large bare rocky pad is located 40 metres (130 ft) north-north-west of the cairn site. The pad is surrounded on the east, south and western sides by drainage diversions lined with local stone. These are possibly the remnants of the superintendent's quarters.

A rectangular reinforced concrete reservoir is located 150 metres (490 ft) north-north-west of the possible superintendent's quarters. The reservoir is situated high up in a steep gully at the northern end of the saddle area. It measures 12 metres (39 ft) wide and is 10 metres (33 ft) in length. The easternmost corner includes a 1-metre-wide (3.3 ft) overflow outlet which leads north-east and into the adjacent creek. Located 90 metres (300 ft) to the west of the reservoir and over the crest of the saddle is a small section of exposed 2-inch (51 mm) steel water pipe. This pipe continues underground and down the slope to the west towards the northern end of the lock hospital married quarters.

==== Lock Hospital Married Quarters ====
A series of twelve raised concrete pads of former huts are located at the base of the steep western slope of the saddle/ridge. Eleven of these pads are aligned adjacent to a south-east to north-west stone edged track. The first pad is located on the eastern side of the track and at the extreme northern end of the alignment. Each raised pad is of a similar size of 5 by 5 metres (16 ft × 16 ft) with a discernable veranda on the south- west side. Depending upon the topography, the veranda has a small set of up to three entry stairs. Only a light scatter of domestic artefacts is found in association with the pads. Artefacts include metal fragments, bottle glass and ceramic fragments.

Approximately half way along the alignment of married quarters' pads is a concrete pad that was probably the communal kitchen as it features a projection in the north-west corner with the remains of an iron stove.

South of the lock hospital married quarters and adjacent to the main access track is a concrete pad, possibly a laundry building.

The access track which runs adjacent to the married quarters huts continues north past the northernmost pad and up the ridgeline through a shallow cutting. This track may be the track that connected the lock hospital complex with outlying villages to the north and in the vicinity of the later lazaret.

==== Lock Hospital Cemetery ====
The lock hospital cemetery is located 80 metres (260 ft) south-west of the lock hospital married quarters on the Juno Bay side of the Island. The site contains four clearly marked graves and six other possible unmarked graves. All the known and potential graves are concentrated within a relatively small area near the middle of the dune. Of the four identified graves, three have headstones. The first is made of concrete with a Christian cross on top. The second grave has a cement rendered surround with a marble headstone on a concrete base (this is the only headstone which still has a discernable inscription). The third grave with a headstone has a small concrete cross studded with imbedded bivalve mollusc shells and decorated with synthetic fabric flowers. There are potential unmarked graves scattered around the marked graves and they have been identified on the basis of unusual stone arrangements, remnants of dressed timber and discrete fragmentary concentrations of grave furniture.

==== New Farm and Inland Pads ====
Located immediately west of the dry stone wall enclosure complex is a large lightly treed area with low grasses and black loam to sandy soils. This area has a small complex of four concrete pads in the south. The largest and southernmost concrete pad features crisp notches on the pad margin that held wall frames giving good information of the construction techniques of the now-missing timber wall structure.

== Heritage listing ==
The former Fantome Island Lock Hospital and Lazaret Sites was listed on the Queensland Heritage Register on 8 June 2012 having satisfied the following criteria.

The place is important in demonstrating the evolution or pattern of Queensland's history.

Fantome Island is important in demonstrating past control and discrimination suffered by Aboriginal, Torres Strait Island and South Pacific Island people under former Queensland legislation.

The Fantome Island Lock Hospital (1928–45) demonstrates, through its location on an island, the response of past governments of Queensland to non-European sexually transmitted infection (STI) patients; in contrast European patients were treated on the mainland.

The lazaret on Fantome Island (1939–73) demonstrates that non-European Hansen's disease (leprosy) patients were kept at different facilities from European patients. It also provides evidence of the significant work undertaken by religious orders with non-European patients in Queensland, including the Order of Our Lady Help of Christians, and the Franciscan Missionaries of Mary.

The remnants of both the lock hospital and the lazaret demonstrate the minimal financial commitment and concern of past governments towards non-European patients.

The place demonstrates rare, uncommon or endangered aspects of Queensland's cultural heritage.

The remains of the Fantome Island Lock Hospital are evidence of Queensland's only island-based lock hospital.

The remains of the Fantome Island Lazaret provide evidence of one of only two lazarets built in Queensland for non-European patients.

The place has potential to yield information that will contribute to an understanding of Queensland's history.

The extensive archaeological remains of the former lock hospital and lazaret on Fantome Island have the potential to yield, through further investigation and comparative research, new information on the administrative, medical, domestic and agricultural activities of patients and staff. This will contribute to a greater understanding of Queensland's history - particularly the accommodation, treatment and isolation of Aboriginal, Torres Strait Islander and South Sea Islander Hansen's disease and STI patients.

Few documentary sources are available that describe the layout and operation of the lock hospital, which closed well before the lazaret, or record the lives of the people who lived there; making the remains of what was Queensland's only purpose-built island lock hospital an invaluable resource for further study.

Similarly extensive are the archaeological remains of the lazaret; an important record of Queensland's largest and longest-serving island facility for the treatment of non-European Hansen's disease patients.

The place is important in demonstrating the principal characteristics of a particular class of cultural places.

The lock hospital and lazaret sites are important in demonstrating the characteristics of Queensland medical facilities for non-European Hansen's disease and STI patients. These include: segregation on an island; the further segregation of European staff accommodation from non-European staff and patients; cemeteries; the existence of administrative/store building precincts, medical treatment facilities, separate accommodation for unmarried male and female patients, and attempts at food self-sufficiency through gardens and livestock.

The place is important because of its aesthetic significance.

The visual contrast between the remnants of the lock hospital and lazaret and their picturesque but isolated tropical island setting elicits a strong aesthetic response from visitors. This contrast, considered alongside the history and associations these remnants represent, makes Fantome Island a powerfully evocative place.

The place has a strong or special association with a particular community or cultural group for social, cultural or spiritual reasons.

Fantome Island has a strong and special association with former patients and staff, and their descendants, as a place which had a profound effect on their families. Most people on Palm Island have at least one family member buried on Fantome Island.

The place also has a special association with surviving members of the Franciscan Missionaries of Mary who served on Fantome Island.

== Documentary film ==
A feature-length documentary film, Fantome Island, was released in 2011, made by Sean Gilligan and co-produced by Adrian Strong. It follows the story of former patient Joe Eggmolesse, a Kanaka (Pacific Islander) man who had spent 10 years there as a child and who returns to the island for a special Remembrance Day as a 73-year-old. The historical background of racist policies practised by the Queensland government and certain individuals is narrated and shown. The film was shown in the 2011 Brisbane International Film Festival and went on to win two awards, the 2012 John Oxley Memory Award by the State Library of Queensland, and Best Australian Documentary at the 2012 Human Rights Arts & Film Festival. The film has also been shown on NITV and SBS on Demand.
