= Opala (surname) =

Opala is a surname. Notable people include:

- Joseph Opala (born 1950), American historian
- Marian Opala (1921–2010), American judge
- Rosemary Opala (1923–2008), Australian writer and nurse
