= 1930 Palm Island tragedy =

- Date: 3 February 1930
- Location: Palm Island Aboriginal settlement on Great Palm Island in Queensland, Australia
- Organised by: Robert Henry Curry
- Deaths: 3
- Injuries: 2
- Property damage: set fire to several buildings
- Inquiries: Attorney-General of Queensland
- Inquest: Magistrate Cameron PM
- Arrests: Pattison and Hoffman
- Suspects: Peter Prior
- Convicted: 0

IOn 3 February 1930, Robert Henry Curry, superintendent of the Aboriginal settlement on Great Palm Island in Queensland, Australia, shot and wounded two people and set fire to several buildings, killing his two children. Later in the day, the superintendent was shot dead. An official inquiry by the attorney-general of Queensland followed. Those involved in the shooting death were charged with murder, but during the trial, under the advice of the trial judge, the Crown Prosecutor dropped the charges.

== Background ==
The superintendent of the settlement was Robert Henry Curry; he had been the Superintendent of Palm Island since the settlement was moved from Hull River twelve years earlier. His wife died during childbirth in November 1929. The Medical Officer at the settlement was Dr. C. Maitland Pattison. According to Dr Joanne Watson's biography of Curry, "By December [1929] Curry was grief-stricken, fearful of losing his position, drinking heavily and withdrawing from novocaine—Pattison's treatment for 'neuralgia of the cranial nerve'."

During the 1920s, rivalries, bitterness and escalating feuds appear to have developed between the white officials on Palm Island. As a result of this situation there were several investigations into the conduct of officials on Palm Island. Stipendiary Magistrate Cameron chaired one inquiry ending on 18 April 1929, while Justice Nevitt chaired another, which provided its report to the Home Department on 7 February 1930. The allegations investigated included:

- A documented assault on a clerk (Tedman) by Curry in 1919;
- An alleged threat to torch the residence if removed, made by Curry to Gall in 1925;
- At least two alleged assaults on Ballard by Curry in the mid-1920s;
- A drunken altercation between Curry and Gall in Lowthes Hotel (South-Townsville) in 1927;
- At least two assaults on Dr Pattinson by Curry in 1928;
- A documented assault on Dr Pattinson by Mrs Ballard in 1929, in response to verbal attack on Mr & Mrs Ballard by Dr Pattinson; and
- A serious altercation between Curry and Dr Pattinson on Christmas Day 1929 (with allegation that issue was caused by supply of alcohol by Dr Pattinson to Aboriginal Nurse and patient);

Then there were the numerous allegations of other categories of serious impropriety, including:

- Theft of takings from Football, allegation made by Curry against Hoffman (substantiated and repayment made);
- The 'Flogging' of an adult Aboriginal woman, René Harvey, by Curry, substantiated by Cameron SM, Curry advised by Under-Secretary Gall on 18 April 1929; and
- Allegations serious sexual impropriety by Curry, by unnamed parties amongst both the white officials and Aboriginal residents;

The report by Justice Nevitt regarding the administration of the Palm Island settlement, found that despite excessive drinking, bickering between Curry and Pattison, and the provision of alcohol to residents, that the management of the settlement was entirely adequate and acceptable. In releasing the Nevitt Report (after the tragedy), Queensland Premier Moore said that he was informed by his Home Department that the discipline at Palm Island had been good and management effective.

== Incident ==
=== 3 February 1930 ===
During the early morning hours of Monday, 3 February 1930, Robert Curry shot Dr. Pattison in the thigh and Dr. Pattison's wife in the neck. Using a form of dynamite called gelignite, he set fire to his own house, killing his step-daughter Edna Mather and son Robert Curry, Jr. He set fire twice to the office; and set fire to the thatch roof of the schoolhouse, the retail store, and the residence of the Assistant Superintendent Thomas Hoffman.

Between 40 and 50 Aboriginal children were pupils of the burned school.

At daylight Curry destroyed the supply launch Esme, and left in the second launch, the Rita, for Fantome Island. On Fantome Island he informed the Lock Hospital attendant Mr. Morcom of the events of the night and told him that he intended to lay the Rita off Curacoa Island and chase down any boat that left Palm Island. According to the hospital attendant he then intended to return to Palm Island and "clean off" the rest of the whites, then wait for the police boat to "have a bit of fun with them". Morcom believed that Curry was playing a practical joke, until a dinghy arrived to obtain his help and take him to Great Palm Island.

Curry returned in the afternoon brandishing two firearms, when he was met on the beach by a small party of young Indigenous residents. He was shot four times: in the lower portion of the abdomen, upper portion of the thigh, and in each wrist. Curry was moved to the local hospital and attended to by Morcom, but died within two hours.

=== Shooting of Curry ===
Several young Aboriginal men, including Peter Prior, Harold Conway, Clive Beckett, Caeser Anning, Jimmy Harvey and Ellison Obah were provided with arms and sent down to the beach to patrol and await the return of Superintendent Curry from Fantome Island. These Aboriginal men had been given the responsibility of ensuring the safety of all on the Island, while the 'white men lay skulking and quaking in the bush.' Assistant-Superintendent Hoffman is reported to have told Ellison Obah that 'I will give anyone £1 to get Curry, and I will stand the responsibility.'

Curry returned from Fantome Island on the Launch Esme; he was armed with a rifle and a revolver. Nobody challenged Curry on the Beach, so he proceeded to walk toward the settlement. At this point, he pointed the revolver toward the rear of the boatshed, directly at the position occupied by Peter Prior (who was armed with a shotgun with a magazine) and two other men, being Caeser Anning and Clive Beckett (both armed with rifles). Prior fired two shells from the shotgun, hitting Curry in the abdomen, chest, head and arms.

[Curry] was raising his hand with the revolver as if to take a shot when I fired my shot gun and he fell and as I fired I heard another report outside... I am certain that my shot hit him first and that caused him to fall. I was afraid that he would have shot us all if I had not shot first.

Curry collapsed and dropped his weapons after being hit; he was given medical treatment, but died the next morning. An autopsy revealed that death had been caused by being hit by a wound to the abdomen.

=== Assistance arrives ===
Police and Dr. Taylor from Townsville were dispatched to Palm Island after the fact. The wounds to both Dr. Pattison and his wife had narrowly missed vital organs. Dr. Pattison had attended to his own wounds, and was later assisted by Mrs. Pattison and Morcom, who were commended by Dr. Taylor in the media. Dr. and Mrs. Pattison were moved to the Townsville Hospital. An estimate for the damage was £7000. Arrangements were made in the following days for provisions to be supplied from Townsville to replace those destroyed on Palm Island.

== Aftermath ==
=== Curry's state of mind ===
Curry wrote letters on 2 February 1930, the first to Mr Bleakley (Chief Protector of Aboriginal Settlements) and to a Brisbane newspaper: In these letters, which were published in full in the Townsville Daily Bulletin on 3 March 1930, and which were provided to the second Cameron Inquiry as evidence, Superintendent Curry's state of mind immediately prior to the tragedy is readily apparent, most disturbingly he states in his letter to Mr Bleakley:

Dear Mr Bleakley,

This will be the last letter that ever you will receive from me, and I must thank you and the heads of your department for the unjust treatment you have dealt out to me in the past.
...
I have no regrets about anything I have done to the doctor, and he deserves all he gets. I was told by the so-called visiting Justice I could lay no complaints against Fantome, as it was not in my department. That goes to show things must go on unexposed.
...
I know Gall will miss doctor. At any rate he can send a wreath along, as I am going to revenge those who have injured me, and I will make them cry for mercy. I am just as sane as you are, so don't think otherwise.
Kind regards,

(signed) R.H. Curry (2 February 1930)

Not only did Curry write what is apparently a suicide note attempt to justify in advance what he intended to do, he mentions dissatisfaction with the "visiting Justice" and the prospects of exposing the situation on the Island. Presumably he was referring to Justice Nivett, who was conducting an inquiry into allegations against Curry at that time, and whose report to the Secretary of Home Affairs was due to be handed down on 7 February 1930. It has been suggested that Curry was fearful that he should lose his position and his livelihood and that he had an unhealthy attachment to the Settlement. Curry feared that the outcome of the Nevitt Inquiry would be his removal from the Settlement and he blamed Assistant-Superintendent Hoffman, Under-Secretary Gall, and Dr Pattison (and the Matron – Mrs Pattison) for his downfall.

=== Inquest ===
There was an immediate outcry about the situation on Palm Island and within the Home Secretary's Department, with several parties – including the Returned Sailors and Soldiers League, calling for a full, open inquiry into the events. Speaking soon after the tragedy, Mr Gall, described the situation:

In my opinion, Curry for some years had an obsession that he was to be superseded in his position. This idea first took place when Mr. Hoffman was appointed assistant superintendent, and the position was accentuated when Dr. Patterson (sic) was appointed medical officer. Curry was most impulsive, he would not tolerate interference by anybody on the staff on Palm Island, and if they did interfere he was inclined to deal with them in a most summary way. Curry did very fine work on Palm Island, but, after all, that was his feeling that everybody was out to do him an injury. As a matter of fact, nothing was further from the truth. Nobody wanted to hurt him.

The Home Affairs Department held that given the completion of an inquiry that found Curry to be a competent manager on the same day he murdered his children and attempted to murder the doctor and his wife, there was no need for a full inquiry into the tragedy. The irony of this situation was described by Dr Joanne Watson, who examined the incident at length in her 1994 doctoral thesis:

Despite the seriousness of these charges and the further evidence provided to Nevitt of bitter feuding amongst the administration on Palm, his report argued that 'he found a high state of efficiency, both externally and internally, in the administration of the settlement', and that 'the management reflected the greatest credit on all concerned.' This must have been one of the grimmest ironies in the history of Queensland, for on the very day that this report reached the Home Office, Curry ran amok, clad in a red bathing suit and armed with dynamite, petrol and revolvers he blew up the reserves' main administrative buildings, set fire to the homes of other officials, shot the doctor and his wife, set fire to the island and murdered his own children.

Magistrate Cameron PM, who had previously held an inquiry into the administration of the Island, decided to hold an Inquest into the death of Superintendent Curry. Despite the volumes of evidence provided and the need to examine 27 witnesses, this inquest was concluded on 28 March 1930, after sitting for only 28 hours all-told. On the basis of the evidence provided to the inquest by witnesses including Peter Prior, Clive Beckett, Caeser Anning, Jimmy Harvey and Ellison Obah, and the Police Magistrate, Cameron felt that there was sufficient evidence to take the matter to trial.

=== Evidence ===
As a result of the official inquiry into the three deaths, held in Townsville, on 15 April the Queensland Cabinet met and Attorney General Neil MacGroarty announced that the Government would prosecute as murder the death of the Superintendent. In May, Pattison and Hoffman were charged with procuring indigenous resident Peter Prior (Note: Some sources give the spelling as "Pryor".) to murder the Superintendent, as based on testimony from the foreman in charge of a sawmill on Palm Island and evidence given by the Aboriginal men who witnessed the events, in particular, that of Peter Prior himself, The wife of the storekeeper also testified against Hoffman, claiming that Hoffman offered "some boys" £1 for the first to shoot or spear Curry.

Pattison denied giving a gun to Prior, or anyone else, and also denied having done or said anything which would cause anyone to murder Curry. Assistant-Superintendent Hoffman also denied responsibility for arming the Aboriginal men, including Peter Prior, attempted to deny any knowledge that they were in fact armed, or that they intended to confront Superintendent Curry, that he had told them to do so and even suggested that the Aboriginal men had told him to leave and protect the women and children. Assistant-Superintendent denied having assured the group of Aboriginal men, when questioned as to what would happen to them if they did shoot Curry,

=== Trials ===
Although trial was initially set for Pattison on 11 August, on 19 July prosecutors declined to formally enter the murder charge and Pattison was freed. When the remaining matters, namely the murder charge against Peter Prior and the charge of procuring someone to commit murder against Hoffman, reached the Northern Supreme Court, Mr Justice Robert Douglas had the following discussion with the lead prosecutor, Mr Ross:

His Honor: The facts outlined by you, Mr. Ross, are this: Curry attempted to kill the doctor and his wife, killed his children, burnt his house down, and burnt Hoffman's house.

Mr. Ross: I will prove that Prior shot Curry, and that Hoffman offered a pound to the first one who would do it.

His Honor: If Hoffman shot Curry when he arrived, do you agree that he was justified in doing so?

Mr. Ross: Yes.

His Honor: Then did you file a true bill because it was not a white man who shot him? I'll tell the jury on your opening, Mr. Ross, that if a man attacks the community as Curry did there, the community would be justified in defending itself even to the extent of killing him. I don't think any reasonable man could think otherwise.

His Honor further stated that if a conviction was made at the trial the Court of Criminal Appeal would quash the conviction. Mr. Ross: In that case, your Honor, I will file a nolle prosequi.

His Honor: I think that is the best thing you can do. I don't think the bill should ever have been filed.

The defendants were released. The only other similar shooting was that of a police officer in Tuckiar v The King (1935), in which the full court of the High Court of Australia overturned the guilty verdict of the NT Supreme Court (Mr Tuckiar vanished upon his release, and is presumed to have been killed by NT Police upon his release.

== Subsequent events ==
Pattison resigned as medical officer at the Palm Island Aboriginal Settlement as of 15 September 1930.
