= Rosemary Opala =

Australian artist (1923–2008)

- Born: Rosemary Fielding; January 1923; Bundaberg, Queensland
- Died: 2008
- Known for: Nursing, sketching, writing
- Spouse: Marian Opala
- Awards: Nominated for Australian Living Treasure 2002

Rosemary Opala (née Fielding) (1923–2008) was an Australian artist, writer and nurse, she is regarded for her work as a Queensland environmentalist, historian, social commentator and community activist.

Opala's literary and artistic themes reflect her personal experiences and social outlook. Her work is noted for focusing on Queensland wildlife, nursing, womanhood, family life and social history.

Opala focused much of her nursing career on Peel Island's Lazaret (Leper colony or Leprosarium) caring for patients with Hansen's Disease (Leprosy). Through both her art and writing, Opala became a significant commentator on the Lazaret's history, its social stigma and the controversial treatment of its patients.

== Background ==
Born in Bundaberg on 24 January 1923, Opala was raised in Palmwoods on the Sunshine Coast, Queensland Opala lived with her parents, Harold Fielding and Ethel Fielding (born Ethel, née Witney) and her younger sister Her mother, Ethel Fielding was a published author of poetry and short stories. Opala attended Palmwoods Primary School, and completed her education at Nambour High School

Opala moved to Brisbane in the 1940s to complete an art course at George Street Technical College (later Queensland University of Technology). At the commencement of World War II, Opala began a nursing training after leaving art school, in order to 'do something more useful than playing with paints'. Also during the 1940s, while training at Brisbane General Hospital, she was a freelance writer, with many short stories and essays published in Australia's most prominent women's magazines. At the same time Opala also took to sketching and drawing, which included patients and staff in the hospital and the Brisbane General hospital building.

While in nursing school in Brisbane, Opala encountered Hansen's Disease (Leprosy) patients from Peel Island, and was convinced to transfer to the Lazaret (Leper colony or Leprosium) on the island in the Queensland Moreton Bay area. From the late 1940s until 1959 when the Lazaret was closed, Opala worked on the Island with Hansen's disease patients, with intermittent periods of other work on mainland Queensland. During the 1950s and 1960s Opala continued to write and sketch subjects such as her experiences on the Island and its native flora.

In the 1960s after working at Peel Island, Opala and her|Polish]] husband, Marian moved to Redland Bay and later to Coochiemudlo Island where they built a house near Main Beach. They had no children. Leaving the island in the late 1960s, Opala continued her career as a nurse, working in placements in Cleveland and Bundaberg, and eventually to Prince Charles hospital in Brisbane. In 1977 Opala received her diploma in Nursing Administration, and took a position as a Supervisor at Prince Charles Hospital Brisbane in 1980. She retired from nursing in 1989 and remained at Victoria Point in Redland Bay.

== History ==
=== Nursing career ===
Opala gained her diploma in nursing on 3 May 1945 from the Brisbane and South Coast Hospitals Board and was later admitted as a Fellow of the College of Nursing on 19 March 1977. She chose this career despite her artistic talents due to the demand for nurses during World War II.

Opala was registered as a General Nurse of Brisbane General Hospital on 6 June 1945, was registered as a Midwifery Nurse of Brisbane Women's hospital (later Royal Brisbane Women's hospital) on 16 September 1948, and received her Diploma in Nursing Administration on 17 December 1976.

Throughout her career Opala worked as a nurse at St Anne's, Westwood TB Sanatorium, and Brisbane General Hospital. She had periods in private hospitals and spent two terms on Peel Island.

Opala assumed the role of a qualified nurse taking her first role at the Brisbane General Hospital, now Royal Brisbane Hospital with a fairly pessimistic view of the profession. While working there, Opala wrote on key issues facing the nursing profession, documenting changes in education requirements to become a nurse, changes in the duties of nurses and most significantly, the shift of nursing education from out of the hospitals and into the colleges. She had a fairly pessimistic attitude early in her career, describing herself as a "glorified domestic worker" documenting her duties as revolving primarily around cooking and cleaning for the patients, rather than specialised medical duties.

Whilst treating patients for leprosy during her time at St Anne's, Westwood TB Sanatorium, Opala developed an interest in the disease and a liking for the patients she encountered. Her patient to nurse relationships was unaffected by the social stigma surrounding leprosy in Queensland at the time.

As a qualified nurse, interested in the Island life and nature, Opala assumed her first role as a nurse on the Peel Island Lazaret in the 1940s. Both young and naïve, Opala wrote extensively during her time on the island discussing cures, name changes, segregation of patients, misunderstandings as well as the social life of nurses and patients on the Island.

=== Later years ===
Following Opala's retirement from nursing in 1989, she continued to live an active life. Opala was involved in many community writing and creative activities from her retirement until her 80th birthday in 2004. Already living in Caloundra, where she and husband Marian moved to in the late 1960s, she continued to write frequently for various community outlets, including the Sunshine Coast Daily after her retirement. She also edited for the Caloundra branch of the Wilderness Preservation Society of Queensland's newsletter.

In 2004, Opala was recognized in the inaugural Women of Redlands exhibition ceremony by the Zonta Wynuum Redland Branch. This award recognized Opala's contribution as an artist and Redlands Bay community activist through her work. She displayed artwork in shows for the Redlands Bay area and has donated her works for fundraising for community groups. In addition, Opala was nominated by the Friends of Peel Island Association and the Wilderness Preservation Society of Queensland for recognition as an Australian Living Treasure in 2002

Opala is a foundation and lifetime member of the Friends of Peel Island according to the 2002 nomination letter for Australian Living Treasure from the Friends of Peel Island Association (FOPIA). "Opala supports the community through art and writing and keeps records of flora and fauna".

== Literary career ==
Opala having learnt the craft of writing at a young age from her mother Ethel Fielding, was a prolific writer, writing for the most part of her life. Her work focused on short stories, anecdotal essays and journalism; she occasionally had short stories and poetry published in The Bulletin and Flame. Opala states "I've written and drawn since early childhood in the days when owning one's own book was a rare treat." Much of Opala's literary themes reflect her personal interests, experiences and social outlook. She has had pieces published in various national and local publications. Opala continued to write until her death in 2008.

=== Women's magazines ===
Throughout the 1950s and until the mid-1960s, Opala had a career as a freelance writer, publishing short stories and anecdotal essays. Her work was published in prominent Australian women's magazines including The New Idea, Woman, Woman's Day and The Australian Woman's Mirror. Writing on topics as diverse as family life (particularly the role of the mother and wife), childhood, inter-racial relationships, the assimilation of Australian migrants, public perception of nurses and the outdoors and the Australian environment, Opala's content engaged in topical themes of the time for women and Australian society.

Opala published some pieces under pen names including Kay Brohm and Dymee Spokwi. Her career in fiction writing ended in the mid-1960s as she went back into full-time nursing.

=== Environmental writing ===
In the 1990s Opala began to publish her writing again, predominantly focused on her passion for natural history and wildlife conservation. She wrote journalistic columns for various community and national based publications often promoting local flora and fauna. Stylistically, Opala would often mix personal anecdotes and opinion with factual information to illustrate the beauty of her subject. Many of her columns featured her own illustrations. Publications featuring her environmental articles include:

- Wildlife Australia Magazine
- Sunshine Coast Daily (including Opala's regular feature column on Watch)
- Eco Echo (quarterly magazine published by the Sunshine Coast Environmental Council)
- The Queensland Naturalist (Official Journal of the Queensland Naturalist Club Inc.)
- Wildlife Preservation Society of Queensland Bayside Newsletter
- USA Redlands Newsletter
- FOPI Flyer (Friends of Peel Island Newsletter)

Opala continued to write on natural history and conservation through to the mid-2000s.

=== Social history and activism ===
Opala also became regarded for her writing on local social histories. She wrote various reflective accounts of her personal experiences in Queensland which have been published in various outlets including Australian Folklore Annual.

Peel Island

Opala wrote much about her life as a nurse on Peel Island, Queensland. Much of her writing focused on correcting the 'myths' and 'misunderstandings' associated with the island and the Lazaret. In an article for Australian Folklore, Opala states: "Even though decommissioned, some institutions however continue to be a focus for 'myths and legends.' Among such, Peel Island remains both source and object of its folklore". She expressed great empathy for the patients as she wrote about the impact of isolation on the island and the stigmas attached to patients. Opala suggested that the Queensland Health Department's decision to isolate patients in order to allay public anxiety had an opposite effect as the perception was that Hansen's disease was far worse than it is.

== Art ==
Opala created works based on her life as a nurse, her time on Peel Island, magazine writings and eventual retirement on Coochiemudlo Island. Available for viewing in the Fryer Library at The University of Queensland, St Lucia, Opala's drawings while a nurse at the Brisbane General Hospital depict the practices and occupations of the staff and patients as well as the various surroundings of the hospital. These drawings serve as historical cultural artifacts in the documenting of the Brisbane General Hospital between 1940 and 1945 from the point of view of a female nurse and are valuable records of her own perception of her time spent at the Brisbane General Hospital. A series of watercolour, ink and pencil illustrations document details of scenes from the Brisbane General Hospital, depicting patients, doctors and nurses as well as the surrounding area. This collection of illustrations provide insight into the Medical Practitioners and architectural landscape of Brisbane between 1940 and 1945.

As an environmentalist, Opala illustrated extensively the fauna and flora of the greater Brisbane area particularly focusing on Peel and Coochiemudlo islands.
