= Peel Island (Queensland) =

Island in Moreton Bay, Queensland, Australia

Native name: Teerk Roo Ra
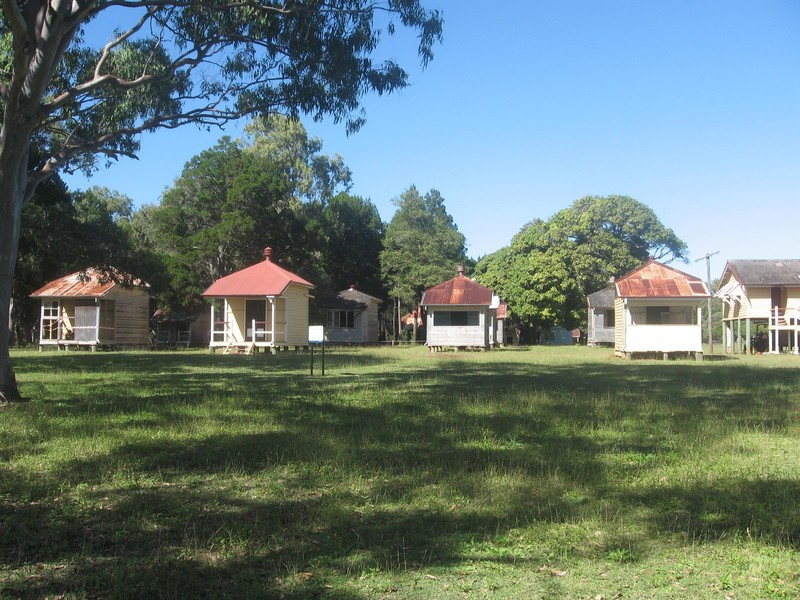
- Lazaret huts, 2010
- Interactive map of Peel Island

Geography
- Location: Moreton Bay
- Coordinates: 27.4980°S 153.3538°E
- Area: 590 ha (1,500 acres)
- Length: 1 km (0.6 mi)
- Width: 3 km (1.9 mi)

Administration
- Australia
- State: Queensland
- Region: South East Queensland
- Local government area: Redland City

Peel Island
- Suburb
- Interactive map of Peel Island
- Coordinates: 27.4980°S 153.3538°E
- Country: Australia
- State: Queensland
- City: Moreton Bay
- LGA: City of Redland

Government
  - State electorate: Oodgeroo
  - Federal division: Bowman

Area
  - Total: 12.4 km^{2} (4.8 sq mi)

Population
  - Total: 0 (2021 census)
  - Density: 0.00/km^{2} (0.00/sq mi)
- Time zone: UTC+10:00 (AEST)
- Postcode: 4184
Suburbs around Peel Island
Moreton Bay	Moreton Bay	Moreton Bay
Cleveland	Peel Island	Dunwich
Moreton Bay	Moreton Bay	Moreton Bay

Peel Island
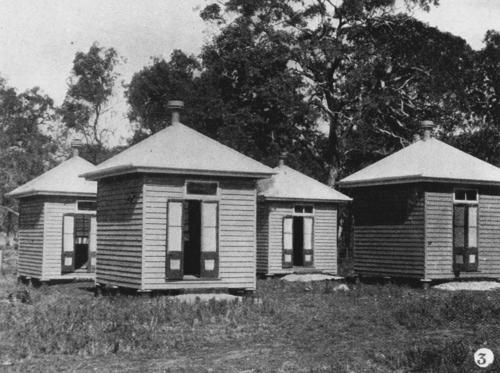
- Huts constructed for patients on Peel Island, Moreton Bay, 1907
- Interactive map of Peel Island

History
- Built: 1870s–1960s

Site notes
- Owner: Queensland Parks and Wildlife Service

Queensland Heritage Register
- Official name: Peel Island, Moreton Bay
- Type: Health and care services: Lazaret/leprosarium
- Criteria: A: The evolution or pattern of Queensland's history; B: Rare, uncommon or endangered aspects of Queensland's cultural heritage; E: Its aesthetic significance
- Designated: 21 June 1993

Peel Island (Janday: Teerk Roo Ra, also sometimes phonetically spelt Jercuruba or Jercroobai) is a small heritage-listed island located in Moreton Bay, east of Brisbane, in South East Queensland, Australia. The island is a locality within the local government area of Redland City and a national park named Teerk Roo Ra National Park and Conservation Park.

The island is only accessible by watercraft. Dugongs, turtles, dolphins, jellyfish, and sharks are known to inhabit the waters around the island. Horseshoe Bay, with its sandy beach, is popular with boating visitors, and a common overnight anchorage for sailors and sea kayakers. The island is known for its natural environment, with bird and animal life largely undisturbed by pollution. In the 2021 census, Peel Island had "no people or a very low population".

The isolation and limited access to Peel Island has meant that many of the original lazaret buildings still stand in original condition to this day. Access is restricted in an effort to preserve the historic remains. As a result, the Queensland Parks and Wildlife Service has managed the park since 1992, during which time they have restored a number of key structures, and have worked to make the island a safe place for future visitors.

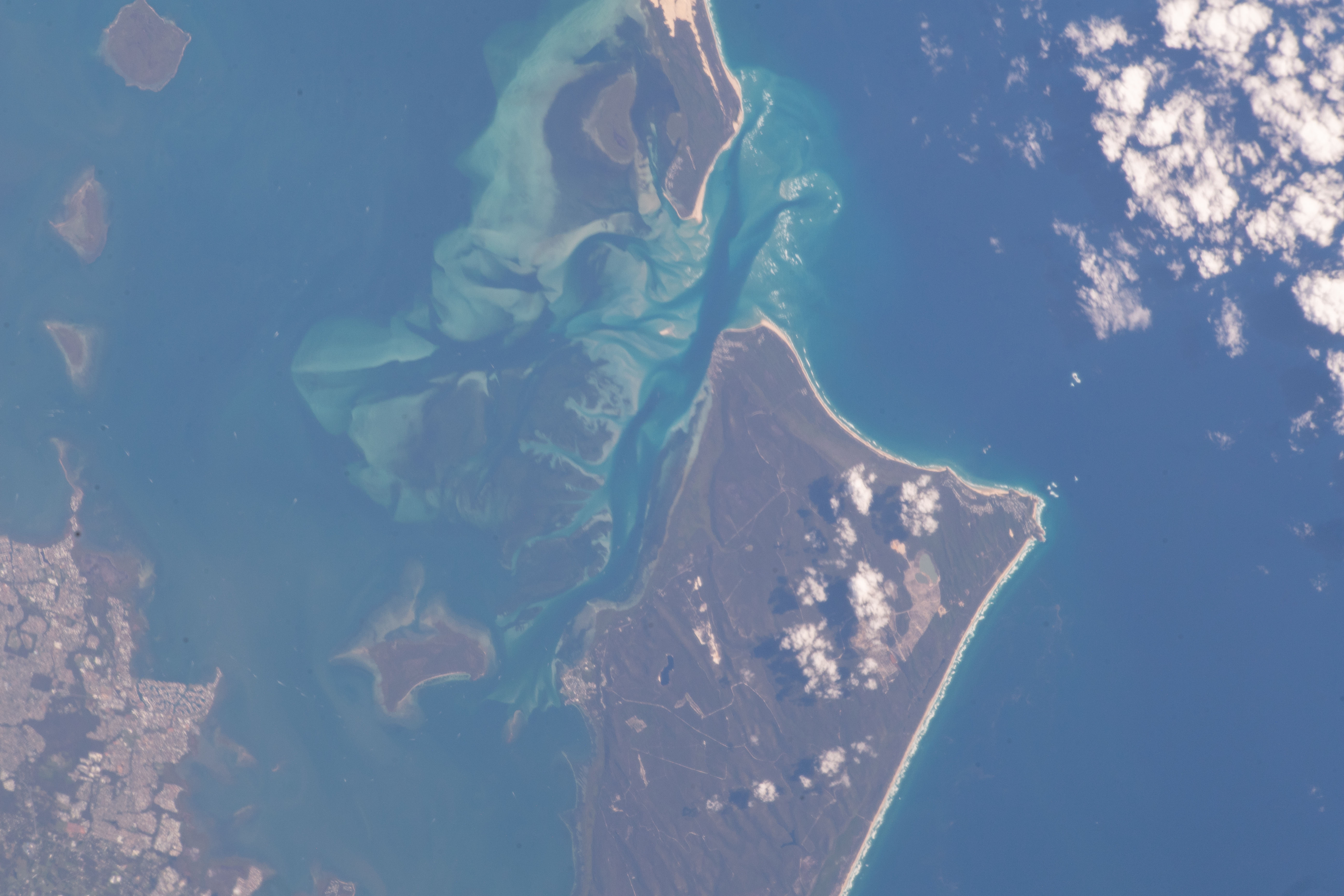
Peel Island, located between North Stradbroke Island and Cleveland

== Geography ==
Peel Island is situated in the southern half of Moreton Bay on the east coast of Australia, approximately 20 kilometres (12 mi) from Brisbane, Queensland, and 6 kilometres (3.7 mi) from the town of Cleveland. The island lies between Cleveland Point and Dunwich on North Stradbroke Island and is fringed with mudflats, seagrass, coral reefs and mangroves. The island covers an area of approximately 400 hectares (990 acres), and extends for 1 kilometre (0.62 mi) north to south and 3 kilometres (1.9 mi) east to west. Horseshoe Bay, running in an unbroken arc along the southern side of the island, provides clean, sheltered waters for swimming.

The northern tip is known as Cucumber Point. A headland to the south-east is known as The Bluff. The Harry Atkinson Artificial Reef has been constructed to the north of Peel Island, off of Amity Banks. It was established in 1975. More closer in the west is another artificial reef, known as West Peel Artificial Reef. Peel Island has been part of a declared fish habitat zone since 1971.

== Demographics ==
In the 2016 census, Peel Island had "no people or a very low population".

In the 2021 census, Peel Island had "no people or a very low population".

== History ==
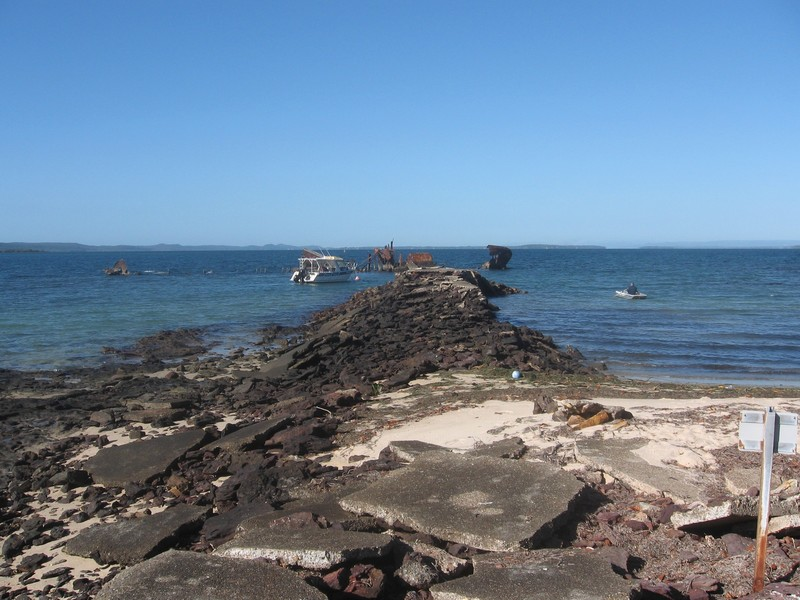
Former stone jetty, 2010

From the mid-19th century until 1906, Peel Island was used as a quarantine station for the colony of Brisbane. Sailing ships would anchor to the north of the island, and the passengers would disembark on Peel Island for a quarantine period before moving on to Dunwich on nearby North Stradbroke Island. The arriving sailing ships would be fumigated and scrubbed down with carbolic to sanitise them before they ventured on to Brisbane with the new arrivals.

The quarantine station was located on the eastern side of the island at a placed called 'The Bluff'. In 1910 the defunct buildings were utilised for an inebriate asylum. The inmates were made to harvest sisal and manufacture rope which was sold to help fund the asylum. The asylum was shut and the buildings demolished in 1916 with the remaining inmates being transferred to Dunwich.

Between 1907 and 1959 a leper colony facility was established on the western side of the island. The leper colony's housing has had preservation works, and been 3D digitally mapped.

In 2007, the island was declared as Teerk Roo Ra National Park and Conservation Park, usually called Teerk Roo Ra National Park. Since 2011 it has been jointly managed by the Quandamooka Yoolooburrabee Aboriginal Corporation and the Queensland Parks and Wildlife Service.

== Peel Island Lazaret ==
Peel Island operated as a lazaret from 1907 to 1959. The Peel Island lazaret, or leprosarium, is important to Queensland history because of its social and political significance in terms of state health policy, serving as a reminder of the conditions in which people lived and worked on the island.

=== Background ===
The lazaret (lazaretto, leper colony or leprosaria) in Queensland was established to isolate those infected with leprosy. The influx of migrants to Queensland after colonisation brought leprosy, or Hansen's disease, to Australia. Hansen's disease has had a history of forced patient isolation from society, and Queensland's Leprosy Act of 1892 was an example of legislation intended to isolate leprosy patients from the mainland.

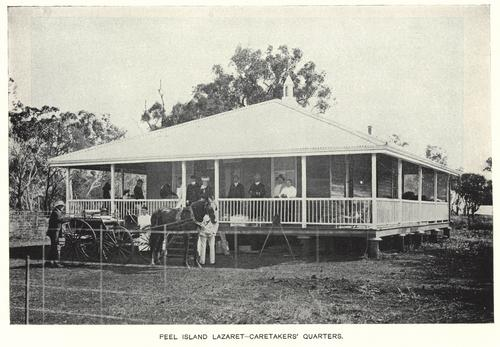
Peel island caretaker cottage, 1907

Before Peel Island was used as a lazaret in 1907, it was used for a number of other purposes by colonial and Queensland governments, as well as being occupied by Aboriginal people. Before British colonial settlement in Australia, Indigenous people lived on Peel Island, with the land used as a feasting and ceremonial site. Archaeological studies show evidence of Indigenous occupancy through the presence of several midden sites. Into the 1800s, Peel Island, as well as North Stradbroke Island, was used as a quarantine station by the New South Wales colonial government which "housed persons considered unsuitable for mainstream society". Subsequently, the quarantine station developed into an inebriates' asylum, and then later a lazaret was built in 1907. There were already two established lazarets in Queensland: one on Friday Island and another on Dunwich, North Stradbroke Island. Both were closed due to varied criticism of conditions and treatment of patients. Subsequently, the Peel Island lazaret was established as a replacement. Peel Island was used for multiple purposes at any given time by the government, but was specifically chosen over North Stradbroke Island to permanently establish the lazaret.

=== Conditions ===
Particularly under earlier operations of the lazaret, the isolation of Peel Island more resembled incarceration than that of a medical institution for ill patients. In many instances, sufferers were removed from their families and communities without notice or an opportunity to say goodbye. Patients were often locked up or chained by police before they were taken to the lazaret. There have been several accounts of patients being trawled behind a charter ship, isolated on a dinghy en route to the island. Once, at the facility, patients sought help from the outside community and the press in order to improve the dreadful conditions to which they were subjected. Because the lazaret was designed around the principle of isolation, each patient was housed in a separate hut, then grouped into three compounds according to gender, race and severity of illness. Each compound was surrounded by 8-foot (2.4 m)-tall wired fences which would be locked at night so as to prevent perceived "illicit behaviour" between the patients.

In a standard hut, each patient was supplied with a bed, chest of drawers, table and chair. In the lazaret's later years of operation, awnings were also added to the huts to protect the patients from the elements. Other lazaret buildings on the island included a kitchen, dining room, bathhouses, nurses’ cottages, attendants’ quarters and caretakers’ residences. For many years it was prohibited to remove the bodies of patients who had died on the island, making it necessary for them to be buried there.

To this day, the site has been preserved and remains a confronting reminder of the conditions of the lazaret.

=== Life ===
Boredom was a real issue for patients on Peel Island. Whilst staff could freely leave the island, patients were confined there – often for many years – without a release date. Patients, mostly men, would often go fishing or do some gardening to pass the days. Most patients had wireless radio sets, and in the later years of the lazaret, films were shown and dances were organised for both staff and patients. Many of these social events led to marriages over the years. Staff would often spend time at Horseshoe Bay, enjoying the beach and serenity away from the centre of the lazaret.

Due to the isolation and oft-substandard living conditions, many patients and staff members enjoyed drinking. By the 1950s, the island's occupants had built a reputation among the wider mainland community for their alcohol consumption and intoxicated behaviour.

Although the Queensland Government was unwavering in its policy of isolating Hansen disease sufferers on Peel Island, issues often arose due to lack of adequate funding. Problems such as poor food supplies, inadequate medical treatment and lack of maintenance only increased the sense of deprivation among patients, as well as staff. The Anglican Church of the Good Samaritan was built in the north-eastern corner of the lazaret in 1908, originally for primary use by Melanesian patients; it subsequently closed.

In 1925, the island's first multi-purpose medical facility was built, and the first hospital building followed in 1937. It was not until 20 years after the opening of the lazaret on Peel Island that the first medical treatment building (a surgery) was erected, and electricity was not available on the island until 1948 – 17 years after it was available on the mainland.

=== Racial discrimination ===
There were dramatic disparities between the treatment of non-white patients (Aboriginals, Torres Strait Islanders, South Sea Islanders and Chinese) and white European patients. When leprosy re-emerged in the colonised world, it was viewed as an imperial disease associated with race. This was reflective of the social attitudes of the time.

After much criticism of the conditions in former lazarets on both Friday Island (which held Indigenous Australians and South Seas Islanders) and Dunwich Benevolent Asylum (which held white Europeans), the opening of the new lazaret on Peel Island held both white and non-white leprosy patients for the first time in Queensland. This close proximity of inter-racial patients highlighted the inequality in patient care.

The lazaret was divided into compounds which separated white and non-white patients. The accommodation and facilities for non-white patients were far less-equipped than those provided for white patients. For the first three years, non-white patients were not provided with any cooking or washing facilities, and their huts were of a far lower standard than those provided to white patients. Non-white patients had to carry their own firewood and water, while white patients had theirs provided for them. At an inquiry into the complaints of patients in 1908, the caretaker of Peel Island highlighted various disparities in the distribution of rations. He stated "half the amount of meat, butter and tobacco allocated to whites was given to coloureds. Unlike the whites, coloured patients were not allocated beer or tapioca." Many non-white patients lived in tents until their huts were constructed. In the early years of the lazaret, the huts in the non-white compound were made of corrugated iron, with corrugated iron roofs and walls. Windows were made by cutting the wall with tinsnips. At first, the floor was merely the existing dirt, which would turn to mud in the rain as there were cracks in the roofs. The floors were later covered in cement. Each hut also often housed two patients, although only built and designed for one. These living conditions were extremely harsh, leaving many non-white patients sick, and it is argued that this had a direct effect on their higher death rate on the island.

At the beginning of World War II, resources for the number of patients on the island became limited. As a result, in 1940 all 50 non-white patients detained on Peel Island were sent to Fantome Island. By 1945, 40 of the patients had died of tuberculosis leaving further speculation as to the treatment of the patients. Authorities recognised the segregation between the basic standard of housing and treatment provided to white versus non-white patients as early as 1912. However, it was not until much later in the operation of the lazaret that these conditions were revised and consequently improved.

=== Patients and staff ===
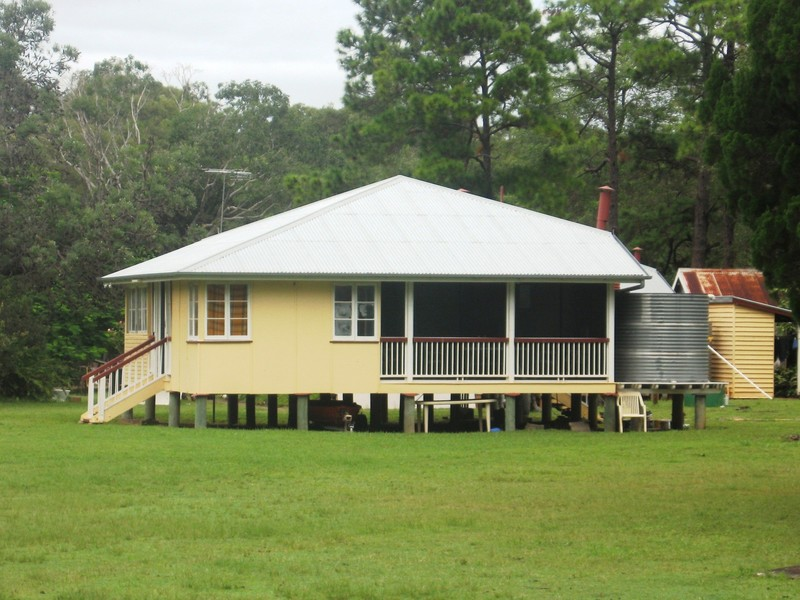
Former nurses' quarters, 2010

When the lazaret first opened in 1907 there were 71 patients – 26 transferred from North Stradbroke Island, 30 from Friday Island, and 15 arriving later from Cooktown, Cairns and Halifax. Over the 52 years that Peel Island was an operating lazaret, over 500 patients passed through its doors. Nearly 200 of these died, while others went into remission and eventually left the island. In some instances, the disease reoccurred, which meant patients had to return to the island, sometimes even for a third or fourth time. Understandably, patients on Peel Island did not agree with the isolation "treatment" policy, and spoke up against the idea. In 1926, 35 patients petitioned to the Premier of Queensland to repeal existing legislation. A section of the petition stated: "There are patients who would astound you by their fine healthy appearance, still they are held in segregation by the cruel and unjust law in existence." It would be another 33 years until the lazaret on Peel Island closed, and patients could return to their communities.

For many of the 52 years that Peel Island was an operating lazaret, it was inadequately staffed. Due to the social stigma associated with Hansen's disease, and the perception that it was highly contagious, it was difficult to find willing nurses, doctors and maintenance staff to work on the island. It was not until 1946 that the island saw its first resident doctor, despite being an institution for the sick. Before this time, patients would receive a weekly visit by a qualified doctor who would provide basic medical care.

- Rosemary Opala was a nurse at Peel Island lazaret. Through both her art and writing, Opala became a significant commentator on the lazaret's history, its social stigma, and the controversial treatment of its patients. She is also recognised for her work documenting and promoting Peel Island's natural environment.
- Noel Laddie Agnew was the son of a postmaster's family and grew up in Dunwich on Stradbroke Island. In 1904, at the age of eight years, he was diagnosed with Hansen's disease and was one of many patients transferred from Stradbroke Island to the Peel Island lazaret in 1907. During his time on Peel Island, Noel listed over 75 species of birds that he observed on the island. In 1913, his seventh year on Peel Island, this list was published in the RAOU journal The Emu. A subsequent list was published in 1921 during his 18th year at the lazaret. In 1937, after the disease had slowly attacked his limbs and optic nerves, Noel Laddie Agnew died on Peel Island at the age of 41.
- June Berthelsen was another patient on the island, having been diagnosed with Hansen's disease in 1956. Her memoir, The Lost Years: A Story of Leprosy, documents her experiences as a sufferer of Hansen's disease, and details her period on the island between 1956 and mid-1958. She was the only patient to have written a personal account about her experiences, which includes descriptions of her time on the island and the difficult daily living conditions there, as well as her experiences from her personal life and encounters off of the island. Her account describes her relationship with the nursing and medical staff on the island. The memoir mentions the Queensland government's non-payment of a pension to women sufferers of Hansen's, while male patients did receive it.

=== Medical treatments and cures ===
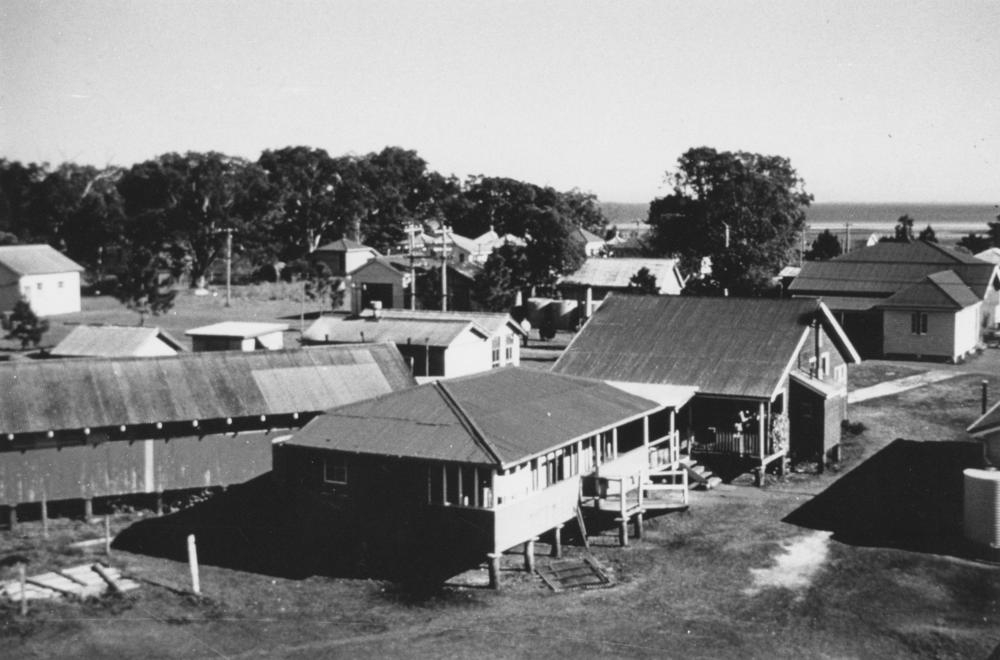
Lazaret in 1954

One of the first experimental treatments for Hansen's disease was the short-lived drug nastin, which involved the injection of the culture of the Bacillus of leprosy. This was followed by the common treatment of injecting patients with oil from the Chaulmoogra nut. Although this treatment was often painful, and there was doubt as to whether it had long-term benefits, it remained a main treatment on Peel Island and around the world for more than 30 years. During this time, many medical professionals believed that a good diet and a stress-free lifestyle was more likely to send the disease into remission. In January 1947, Peel Island patients were treated with the first of several sulfone derivative drugs, which were developed in the United States. These drugs proved the most successful in the long line of treatments for Hansen's disease sufferers, and from then on, the disease became easy to treat.

=== Social consequences ===
Hansen's disease was believed to be highly contagious, with mortality unavoidable. Despite an increase in public understanding of this inaccuracy, this stigma had an incredibly long-lasting impact on the perception of patients on Peel Island. The Queensland Health Department’s decision to allay public fears about the disease by isolating patients backfired, leading the public to believe the disease was worse than it actually was. Rosemary Opala described the island as "folklore" where "the mystery, however, gothic fiction|gothic, is so much more romantic and aesthetically satisfying." From the relocation of patients in 1959 to the Queensland Parks and Wildlife Service taking responsibility in 1992, Peel Island was left relatively untouched, as some of the original stigma remained. Much criticism has been levelled at the treatment of the patients on the lazaret. Hansen's disease not only affected the ill but also their families. As infected patients were sent into isolation, many families were left without a breadwinner; some were driven out of communities by fear and ignorance of the disease, and others found themselves unemployed as word spread about disease in the family. Furthermore, by extension, the carers of the island were viewed by many as a "people apart". Carers were viewed as "do-gooders", resented for their ability to come and go from the island at will.

=== Closing of the lazaret ===
Due to the breakthrough in the treatment of Hansen's disease in the 1940s, the need for isolating patients declined and, therefore, so did the purpose of the lazaret on Peel Island. In 1959, the lazaret officially closed, and the remaining ten patients were sent to the Princess Alexandra Hospital in Brisbane to finish their treatment. By this time, many of the original prejudices about Hansen's disease had been overcome, and fear surrounding the disease had somewhat vanished. Today, several drugs are available that counteract symptoms of Hansen's disease such as nerve damage, deformity, disability and further transmission. Researchers are also working on vaccines to prevent the disease, as well as early detection.

== Heritage listings ==
In 1993, Peel Island was recognised for its outstanding cultural heritage, and was consequently placed on the Queensland Heritage Register and the former Register of the National Estate. In December 2007, Peel Island was declared as Teerk Roo Ra (Place of Many Shells) National Park and Conservation Park. It is also listed on the Redland City Heritage Register.

== See also ==
- History of Brisbane
- List of islands of Queensland
