= Ngajanji =

Aboriginal Australian people

The Ngajanji, also written Ngadyan, and Ngadjon-Jii are an Indigenous Australian people of the rainforest region south of Cairns, in northern Queensland. They form one of eight groups, the others being Yidin, Mamu, Dyirbal, Girramay, Warrgamay, Waruŋu and Mbabaram, of the Dyirbal tribes.

== Ethnonym ==
Ngajanji/Ngadyan was according to Robert M. W. Dixon, the name for the language spoken by a people whose proper tribal name was Ngadyandyi.

== Language ==
The Ngajanji spoke Ngadyan, a dialect of Dyirbal, and one showing the greatest differences with the others, particularly in phonology, where it displays vowel lengthening. A vowel followed by l, r or y and a successive consonant would result in the lengthening of the vowel in question: thus gibar (large fig tree) in the other dialects became gibaa, and jalgur (meat) became jaaguu. It also had a mother-in-law language (Jalnay) in which, when one's mother-in-law or her kin were around, one substituted standard words with a special lexicon. Thus guda (dog) would be replaced by nyimbaa, having the same meaning.

By the time Robert Dixon started studying the language in the mid 1960s, the number of speakers was down to 6. The last informants concerning Ngajan lived in Malanda.

== Country ==
The traditional lands of the Ngajan, covering 200 square miles (520 km^{2}), lay north and west of Innisfail, and extended from the Atherton Tableland plateau rainforest east to the upper Russell River, encompassing Yungaburra, Malanda, and the mountain range north of Millaa Millaa. They were bounded on the northern side by the Yidinji and, to the east, between them and the coast were the Yidinji-Wanyurr. The Waribarra Mamu lay to their south.

== Hypothesis about the people ==
Joseph Birdsell and Norman Tindale once argued that the Ngatjan were one of the tribes demonstrating their Barrinean hypothesis, according to which the Ngatjan, together with 11 other tribes of this area – Mamu, Wanjiru, Tjapukai, Mbabaram, Yidinji, Gungganyji, Buluwai, Djiru, Dyirbal, Gulngai and Girramay – were remnants of a Tasmanoid type retaining the small negrito stature attributed to the original first wave of Aboriginal peoples in Australia. One late informant appears to have believed that the Ngatjan were closely related to the Madjandji.

== Mythology ==
The origin of the three volcanic lakes in the area, Yidyam (Lake Eacham), Barany (Lake Barrine) and Ngimun (Lake Euramoo) is related in Ngajanji myth as the result of the infraction of a taboo by two men who had just being initiated into the tribe. At the time of the event, the terrain of the Ngajanji was open scrubland. Their transgression roused the ire of the Rainbow serpent, who set the land under their camping site trembling, as cyclonic winds also blew in, and a strange red hue coloured the sky. As a result of the fissures in the earth, the panicking people were swallowed up and disappeared into the bowels of the earth. Dixon considers this legend, which he recorded in 1964, to accurately reflect the historic formation of the volcanic lakes some 10,000 years ago, an event retained by virtue of the tenacious transmission of memories of the eruption among this people and another Dyirbal tribe, the Mamu.

== History ==
The Ngajanji around Yungaburra and Lake Eacham were affected by the rush of settlement that followed John Atherton's discovery of tin in 1878 at Tinaroo, and development of Robson's track linking the district to the coast.

== Descendants ==
A Russian adventurer Leandro Ilin (1882–1946) settled in the area in 1910, together with several other Russian émigrés, to establish a settlement they called 'Little Siberia'. A widowed Ngajanji woman, Kittie Clarke, was befriended by him, and after she fell pregnant with his child, he proposed marriage. He failed to obtain permission from the soi-disant Protector of Aborigines at Atherton, and had to struggle to legalize their relationship. They had five children. A documentary film of the story was produced in 2005 by Julie Nimmo.

== Last speakers ==
The last speakers of the dialect were Tommy Land, Jimmy Brown, Mollie Raymond and Ginnie Daniels.

== Alternative names ==
- Eacham
- Eashim
- Eaton
- Hucheon
- Jitjam (lacustrine toponym)
- Narcha
- Natchin
- Nga:tja (name of distinguished tribal elder who died in 1904)
- Ngachanji
- Ngadjen
- Ngadyan
- Ngadyan
- Ngadyandyi
- Ngaitjandji
- Ngatjai

Source: Tindale 1974, p. 183

== Some words ==
- yibi (woman). In Dyirbal this was jugumbil, and gumbul in Girramay.

== Sources ==
- Browning, Daniel (27 October 2005). "Pioneers of Love: Kitty Clarke and Leandro Illin". ABC News.
- Dixon, R. M. W. (1972). The Dyirbal Language of North Queensland. Cambridge University Press. p. 351. ISBN 978-0-521-08510-6.
- Dixon, R. M. W. (2011). Searching for Aboriginal Languages: Memoirs of a Field Worker. Cambridge University Press. ISBN 978-1-108-02504-1.
- Govor, Elena (2000). My Dark Brother: The Story of the Illins, a Russian-Aboriginal Family. University of New South Wales Press. ISBN 978-0-868-40594-0.
- Pannell, Sandra (2009). "Aboriginal Cultures in the Wet tropics". In Stork, Nigel; Turton, Stephen M. (eds.). Living in a Dynamic Tropical Forest Landscape. John Wiley & Sons. pp. 59–70. ISBN 978-1-444-30033-8.
- Tindale, Norman (1974). Aboriginal Tribes of Australia, Ngatjan (QLD). Australian National University Press.
- "Yungaburra". The Sydney Morning Herald. 8 February 2004.
