= Nyawaygi language =

Extinct Australian Aboriginal language

Nyawaygi
- Nywaigi, Geugagi, Njawigi, Nyawigi, Nawagi
- Native to: Australia
- Region: Queensland
- Ethnicity: Nyawaygi
- Extinct: with the death of Willie Seaton
- Language family: Pama–Nyungan: Dyirbalic; Nyawaygic; Nyawaygi

Language codes
- ISO 639-3: nyt
- Glottolog: nyaw1247
- AIATSIS: Y129
- ELP: Nyawaygi

The Nyawaygi language, also spelt Nywaigi, Geugagi, Njawigi, Nyawigi or Nawagi, is an extinct Australian Aboriginal language that was spoken by the Nyawaygi people in North Queensland, on the east coast of Australia. The Nyawaygi language region includes the landscape within the Hinchinbrook Regional Council, Halifax Bay, and Rollingstone. Nyawaygi has the smallest number of consonants, 12, of any Australian language. It has 7 conjugations, 3 open and 4 closed, the latter including monosyllabic roots, and, in this regard, conserved a feature of proto-Pama–Nyungan lost from contiguous languages.

== History ==
The last speaker of Nyawaygi was Willie Seaton. He was raised on Waterview Creek, in the southern area of Nyawaygi territory. Much of the information collected in the language came from him.

== Name ==
The name "Nyawaygi", according to Robert M. W. Dixon, was seemingly used to designate both the Nyawigi people and the language. Willian Craig etymologized the name, using the spelling "Nowa-gee", as containing the word nowa 'no'. Dixon identified the other element -gi as the productive comitative suffix.

== Taboo ==
Possibly, a mother-in-law avoidance language existed in Nyawaygi. Seaton only said ŋayba muːɽiɲa 'I'm ashamed' when "pressed for examples" of such a language. The Dyirbal language, which is spoken nearby, had a taboo form called Dyalŋuy.

== Geographical distribution ==
To the north of Nyawaygi, Warrgamay and Biyay, which were "effectively dialects of a single language", were spoken. Biri was found to the south according to Seaton, and Warrongo was spoken west of Nyawaygi. Off the coast of Halifax Bay, around 10 miles east, Manbara was spoken on the Palm Islands.

== Classification ==
Seaton described Warrgamay and Manbara as the closest languages to Nyawaygi.

== Phonology ==
=== Consonants ===
| | Peripheral | | Laminal | Apical | |
| | Labial | Velar | Palatal | Alveolar | Retroflex |
|---|---|---|---|---|---|
| Plosive | b | ɡ | ɟ | | |
| Nasal | m | ŋ | ɲ | n | |
| Rhotic | | | | r | |
| Lateral | | | | l | |
| Approximant | w | | j | | ɻ |

- Unlike most Australian languages, [d] occurs as an allophone of /r/ when after a consonant. /r/ is realized as [r] in all other environments.
- Laminal consonants /ɟ, ɲ/ are most commonly articulated as lamino-interdental [d̪, n̪]. A palatal articulation for these consonants is most common before /i/, though the dental allophones are still more common.
- /r/ can also occasionally be heard as a tap [ɾ].
- /ɻ/ becomes a flap [ɽ] in word-final positions.

=== Vowels ===
| | Front | Central | Back |
|---|---|---|---|
| Close | i iː | | u uː |
| Open | | a aː | |

== Vocabulary ==
Some words from the Nyawaygi language, as spelt and written by Nyawaygi authors include:

- Alu 'head'
- Angal 'boomerang'
- Balgan 'stone'
- Buramu 'butterfly'
- Gabagan 'aunt'
- Touca tula 'good day'
- Wadi 'laugh'
- Yunggul 'one'
