= Hull River Aboriginal Settlement =

Former settlement in Queensland, Australia

Coordinates: 17°52′10″S 146°06′25″E

Hull River Aboriginal Settlement, sometimes incorrectly referred to as Hull River Aboriginal Mission, was an Aboriginal reserve established in 1914, located at the present location of Mission Beach in the Hull River National Park, Queensland, Australia.

Built on the land of the Djiru people, Aboriginal people from surrounding areas were brought there for their "protection" as well as disciplinary reasons, creating a population of up to 400 residents. The settlement was destroyed by a huge cyclone in 1918, and surviving residents were transferred to the new settlement at Great Palm Island.

== Background ==
The Dyirbal-speaking Djiru Aboriginal people who inhabited this island coast were linguistically, culturally and socially related to the Dyirbal, Girramay and Gulngay groups of the Tully River and Murray River districts. Hunters, fishers and gatherers of the rainforests and coast, they utilised the rich plant and animal resources to provide their needs. They excelled in making and using canoes and rafts, and were expert fishermen of both fresh and marine waters.

Contact with early navigators and coastal surveyors as well as with beche-de-mer fishing boats was established long before the first white people settled the beach areas in 1882. Timber-cutters also camped on the beaches during their expeditions and occasionally utilised Aboriginal labour in return for tobacco or tools.

Chinese banana growers along the Tully River were numerous after 1900. They cleared garden plots and grew bananas that they sent to southern markets, loading them from their sampans onto the lighters which took the fruit out to the coastal steamer waiting at the river mouth. The Chinese employed Aboriginal labourers, paying little, sometimes paying them with rum, and this, along with opium, added to the social problems caused by the loss of land and hunting grounds.

In 1912 a few white settlers set up home at what became known as South Mission Beach.

== The settlement ==
The Queensland Government proposed to establish the Hull River Aboriginal Settlement on high ground in a remote spot at the north end of what is now South Mission Beach, under the Aboriginals Protection and Restriction of the Sale of Opium Act 1897. The Act was the first to give separate legal control over Aboriginal peoples, and was more restrictive than any contemporary legislation operating in other states, implementing the creation of Aboriginal reserves to control the dwelling places and movement of the people and allowing forced removals. The new reserve was intended to solve the social problems caused by the new settlers and clash of cultures, although by the time the settlement opened, many of the Djiru people had moved away and there was probably only about a fifth of the original population in the area.

Superintendent John Martin Kenny, who had been a non-commissioned officer of Native Police at Cooktown, an engineer and an overseer at Cape Bedford Mission, arrived on 1 September 1914 and selected the site, which was exposed to the onshore winds. Homes for the Superintendent, Assistant Superintendent and storekeeper, and a school. The residents were housed in dwellings made of ti-tree bark, mostly situated along the seafront.

They residents worked for the settlement, growing bananas, or sometimes for other employers. Provision of food was very basic, and they had to supplement their diet with bush tucker when they could, or occasionally by fishing and catching turtles when allowed to use the boat.

Over time, more people were removed to the settlement, including from other districts around the state. In 1916, 82 Aboriginal people were placed here for "disciplinary reasons for their relief and protection", from Thursday Island, Cooktown, Chillagoe, Atherton, Ayr, Hughenden, Ukalanda and Stewart's Creek.

By 1916 there were about 490 residents, but around 200 died during 1917 when malaria spread in the area. Others deserted when they could, and by March 1918 there were around 300 people left.

== Cyclone ==
On Sunday 10 March 1918 an intense cyclone and storm surge swept across the area, crossing the Queensland coast at Innisfail and destroying nearly every building in the town. Winds reached 240–288 kilometres (149–179 mi)/hour, and over 305 millimetres (12.0 in) of rain was recorded. The eye of the storm passed near the Hull River Settlement around 10pm, wiping out all of the buildings except for the flour store and shop. Kenny and his daughter were killed by flying debris, as were many residents, and the storm surge, estimated 12 feet (3.7 m) high, destroyed the Aboriginal people's coastal humpies and swept several people out to sea. It also swept hundreds of metres inland.

Records show that 37 people were killed in Innisfail itself and a further 40–60 people killed in the surrounding area. It is likely that many more people were killed at the time. Record-keeping was sketchy and it is possible that well over 100 people were killed, making it the worst natural disaster in Australian history.

== Aftermath and removal ==
A rescue party set out on the Innisfail from Townsville, reaching Dunk Island a few days later. They battled their way through the damaged vegetation and swollen rivers to get to the dead and injured people. The Mrs. Kenny, pregnant at the time, was injured and sent to Townsville, but the Government Medical Officer only arrived on March 31. The survivors who stayed at the Settlement salvaged what food they could.

Estimates of deaths varied, but it is probable that about up to 100 Aboriginal people died and were buried on the site, while Kenny and his daughter were buried in a separate location. Many people had fled into the bush, and many more may have died of their injuries.

The Government Health Inspector recommended the creation of a reserve on Great Palm Island, 37 miles (60 km) off the coast north-east of Townsville to accommodate the remaining residents, and they, along with other Aboriginal people rounded up by police in the surrounding bushland around Tully and Cardwell, were taken there forcibly from June 1918.

The entire settlement was relocated to the new reserve, including salvageable building materials.

== South Mission Beach ==
After the settlement area was abandoned, white settlers slowly moved in, with a town being surveyed in 1938. Initially named Kenny, it was officially renamed as South Mission Beach in 1967.

The Mija Memorial, commemorating the victims of the cyclone, was unveiled 100 years later, on 10 March 2018.
