= Mbabaram people =

Aboriginal Australian people

Mbabaram
Mbabaɽam

Regions with significant populations
- Australia

Languages
- Mbabaram (historically), English (Australian English, Australian Aboriginal English)

Religion
- Australian Aboriginal religion and mythology, Christianity

Related ethnic groups
- Other Dyirbal peoples, Walangama, Agwamin, Mbara, other Aboriginal Australians

Mbabaram or Mbabaɽam, also (M)Barbaram, often referred to as the Barbaram people, are an Indigenous Australian people, originally living in Queensland in the rainforests of the Atherton Tableland.

== Language ==
For a long time mystery surrounded the Mbabaram language. The little that was known of it hinted that it might be a language isolate, since it appeared to differ notably from the surrounding languages. In particular its vocabulary was monosyllabic, an anomaly among Australian aboriginal languages. This puzzle contributed to the Barrinean hypothesis, which regarded the Mbabaram people as a reclusive rainforest remnant of an original Negrito population. The mystery was solved, when, taking a hint from a suggestion from Kenneth Hale, Robert M. W. Dixon discovered that the ostensible differences could be accounted for by noting that Mbabaram words dropped the initial syllable present in contiguous languages, and had developed from a regular Australian language. A phonetic principle outlined by Hale laid down that a second syllable of a Mbabaram word would become o if the original word began with a g. Thus an original guwa (west) would change in Mbabaram to wo, which was indeed their word for "west". The word for "dog" is also in Mbabaram the monosyllabic "dog", not borrowed from English but, following this rule simply a clipped version of gudaga, the word for the animal in Yidin, which exists also in Dyirbal, though there shortened to guda. With this insight, Mbabaram suddenly appeared no longer aberrant, but perfectly regular as an Australian language of the Paman subfamily. (Note: "I now saw that Mbabaram was unique, among languages of this region, in having lost the first syllable from most of its words and having developed new vowels. All of the languages surrounding it had conserved disyllabic forms, similar to those found over most of the continent.")

== Country ==
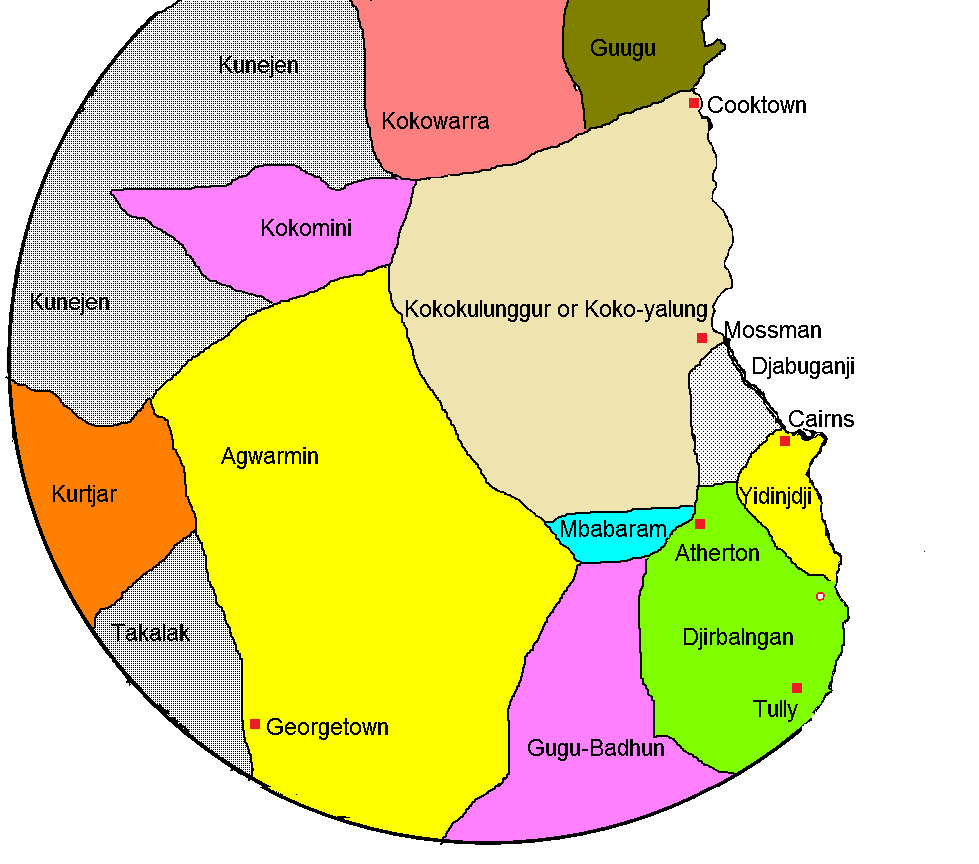
Traditional lands of the Aboriginal peoples around Cairns

The Mbarabam people's traditional territory is on the Atherton Tableland, was bounded by the Kuku Yalanji, near Dimbulah to the north, almost to Mareeba, the Dyirbal people to the east and the down to Irvinebank and the Warungu tribal lands to their south. It extends from an area just west of Almaden across Lappa and east to Atherton, extending over an estimated 1,000 square miles (2,600 km^{2}). Both Norman Tindale and Robert Dixon suggest that at some period in the past, the Mbabaram had moved from or been driven out of the rainforest, westwards into scrubland. By the time of Tindale's investigations descendants were living on "sterile and rugged granite ranges".

== History of contact ==
Following reports that tin lay in their district, Willie Jack and John Newell prospected the area and discovered a payable lode Prospectors Gully in 1880. Dixon estimated that the original Mbabaram population must have been around 500 years before white settlement was settled in the late 19th century. By the time he began his fieldwork in the mid 1960s, he found that mining and the destruction of their rainforest "had ensured that the Mbabaram tribe had dropped... to three old tired men".

Though the Mbabaram language is now extinct, the Mbabaram are still active. Their Native title was recognized in a series of court cases starting in 2001.

== Barrinean hypothesis ==
In a publication of 1941, Norman Tindale, together with the American anthropologist Joseph Birdsell, published a paper suggesting that there were 12 Negrito tribes living on the coastal and rainforest areas around Cairns. The idea had been developed by Birdsell during field work in 1937-8. They were characterized by very short stature, curly hair, and yellowy-brown skin. Six of them were Dyirbal speakers, such as the Jirrbal, Girramay, Gulngai and Djiru within the Murray Upper/Tully Area. Of the others, located further north beyond Cairns, two spoke varieties of Djabugay, and three spoke dialects of Yidin. The remaining tribe were the Mbabaram, whom Tindale took to be strong evidence for his hypothesis because their language, in so far as it had been reported, diverged substantially from the surrounding tongues, and appeared to be wholly atypical, compared to the standard Australian aboriginal languages.

They thought they could identify 8 characteristics shared by the Mbabaram with the other rainforest tribes:

- A patrilineal moiety system based on 4 sections.
- Partial mummification of the deceased.
- The dead were not immediately disposed of, but were cremated only after the jawbones and skulls had been taken about with the nomadic tribes for a certain period of time.
- Having recourse to cannibalism as a food resource.
- Deploying fighting shields that were emblazoned with decorations.
- Manufacturing clothes out of bark.
- Manufacturing baskets fashioned from wood harvested off fig trees, stitched together by string derived from the lawyer-cane.
- Adopting a lengthy leaching process to nuts with high alkaloid content and potentially toxic, in order to render the fruit edible.

A trihybrid thesis had been advanced in the late 19th century redolent of early ideas concerning supposed pure racial types, which posited that Australia had been populated by 3 successive waves of peoples. Supposedly these were the remnants of the hypothetical first wave of peoples to enter Australia, who were then thrust aside by further immigrations, successively undertaken by two distinct peoples with a superior hunting technology. The Tindale–Birdsell argument had revived this model. Birdsell in particular argued that the putative Negrito type surviving in the tropical forests of northern Queensland, were to be taken as Barrineans. He linked them to the Andamanese, arguing they were a "pygmy" group that was the residue of the wave otherwise represented by the "extinct" Tasmanian aboriginals. They had retreated into the rainforest as waves of the light-skinned Murrayians affiliated to the Ainu came through. The third group were the Carpentarians, a dark people with a pronounced brow ridge, whom it was thought were affiliated to ancient Indian tribes.

Birdsell's theory gained wide circulation when Norman Tindale's storybook, The First Walkabout, (1954) coauthored by H. A. Lindsay, became a best-seller. There was no hard evidence for this, archaeological or anthropometric, and it was said to have fallen out of favour. Robert M. W. Dixon, who since the 1960s had been recording the languages of the north Queensland rainforest people, did not exclude the idea. Rumours concerning the Mbabaram as a physically small people who spoke a very different language from their neighbours, held out some chance that the hypothesis held a grain of truth. Dixon eventually determined that Birdsell's theory could not be shown to correlate with the linguistic parameters.

In 2002, it was revived when Keith Windschuttle and Tom Gittin accused modern scholars in Australia of having suppressed the evidence, partially to cater to the feelings of Aboriginal activists disturbed (according to them) by the idea that, given successive waves of "invasion", their claims to native title might suffer from a hierarchy of claims, according to which tribes descended from which hypothetical ancestor of the three.

== Notable people ==
- Two elders, Albert Bennett and Alick Chalk, were able to provide researchers with the basic lineaments of their mothers' Mbabaram language in the early and late 1970s, supplying Robert Dixon, Robert Layton, and Jeff Archer with 300 words and the basics of grammar. Dixon's work with Bennett enabled him to puzzle out its structure and relation to other Dyirbal languages.

== Sources ==
- Bowdler, Sandra (2014). ""Rattling the Bones": The Changing Conrtribution of the Australian Archaeological Record to Ideas about Human Evolution". In Dennell, Robin; Porr, Martin (eds.). Southern Asia, Australia and the Search for Human Origins. Cambridge University Press. pp. 21–32. ISBN 978-1-107-01785-6.
- Dixon, R. M. W. (1972). The Dyirbal Language of North Queensland. Cambridge University Press. p. 348. ISBN 978-0-521-08510-6.
- Dixon, R. M. W. (1977). A Grammar of Yidin. Cambridge University Press. ISBN 978-0-521-21462-9.
- Dixon, R. M. W. (1980). The Languages of Australia. Cambridge University Press. ISBN 978-0-521-29450-8.
- Dixon, R. M. W. (1997). The Rise and Fall of Languages. Cambridge University Press. ISBN 978-0-521-62654-5.
- Dixon, R. M. W. (2010). I Am a Linguist. BRILL. ISBN 978-9-004-19235-5.
- Dixon, R. M. W. (2011). Searching for Aboriginal Languages: Memoirs of a Field Worker. Cambridge University Press. ISBN 978-1-108-02504-1.
- Loos, Noel (1982). Invasion and resistance: Aboriginal-European relations on the North Queensland frontier, 1861-1897. Australian National University Press. ISBN 978-0-708-11521-3.
- Lumholtz, Carl (1889). Among Cannibals: An Account of Four Years' Travels in Australia and of Camp Life with the Aborigines of Queensland. Charles Scribner's Sons.
- McNiven, Ian J.; Russell, Lynette (2005). Appropriated Pasts: Indigenous Peoples and the Colonial Culture of Archaeology. Rowman Altamira. ISBN 978-0-759-10907-0.
- Pannell, Sandra (2009). "Aboriginal Cultures in the Wet Tropics". In Stork, Nigel; Turton, Stephen M. (eds.). Living in a Dynamic Tropical Forest Landscape. John Wiley & Sons. pp. 59–69. ISBN 978-1-444-30033-8.
- Roth, Walter E. (1897). Ethnological Studies Among the North-west-central Queensland Aborigines. Brisbane: E. Gregory, Government Printer.
- Tindale, Norman Barnett (1974). Aboriginal Tribes of Australia: Their Terrain, Environmental Controls, Distribution, Limits, and Proper Names. Australian National University Press. ISBN 978-0-708-10741-6.
