= Mamu people =

Aboriginal Australian people

The Mamu are an Indigenous Australian people of the coastal rainforest region south of Cairns, in northern Queensland. They form one of 8 groups of the generically named Dyirbal tribes, the others being Yidinji, Ngajan, Dyirbal, Girramay, Warrgamay, Waruŋu and Mbabaram.

== Language ==
Mamu had a special mother-in-law language, called Dyalŋuy (Jalnguy). Though sharing many words with Dyirbal, whereas in both languages the ordinary speech term for "foot" is jina, Dyirbal avoidance speech replaces it with jummbur whereas Mamu avoidance language uses winarra, for example.

== Country ==
They inhabited the region from the Russell River and Cooper's point, north of Innisfail, westwards to Millaa Millaa and the Misty Mountains, and south as far as North Maria Creek.

== Mythology ==
There is a Mamu myth, recounted by George Watson, for the aetiology of death. In the Dreamtime, there were two brothers: the older of the two, Muyungimbay, had two wives, while Gijiya had none. Muyumgimbay, while stripping trees to cull witchetty grubs, noted one that was odd, smelt it, and realised it was semen. His suspicions aroused, he then noticed on returning that his two women had semen dripping from their legs. He invited Gijiya to join him gathering grubs from a rotten log the following day. Muyungimbay ordered his brother to start chopping from the opposite end to himself, and when they closed in, chopped Gijiya, and returned to camp, thinking him dead. Yet Gijiya returned, bringing back a short stick of firewood, and, feeling out of sorts, asked his mother to cook his grubs for him. As the piece of wood he brought burned down, his pains increased, until he died as the last of the log was consumed by fire. His mother decapitated him, and put his head in a dillybag as a reminder of her deceased son, and buried the rest. On successive days, presaged by the ga-ga-ga-ga yodelling of a kookaburra, Gijiya's ghost came back to his mother, complaining of a smell. Each time his mother came up with a suggestion – it was a rotten walnut, or the grubs they'd brought back. On the third visit, his mother peaked out from the humpy when he approached complaining, and finally told him the truth: the smell came from his own head which she flourished before him. He chanted:

Gugu-galbu, yaliyali nyurray gijiyagarru burunggaru marri, yunggul yunggulba, gugu-galbu.) 'Farewell, you will all follow me, along the road I lay down to the land of spirits — one-by-one, when your time comes.'

He died because he saw his own head detached from his body. And, he laid down the path for all those who, without exception, from that time on would die and become ghosts.

The first man in Mamu creation stories was Ngagangunu, who set up camp after coming from the east, beyond the sea to the Herbert River. Troubled by a boil on his leg, he squeezed it, and a child sprang out, which, as the first human, also took the name of his father, Ngagangunu signifying 'thigh-born'. Lacking milt, he fed the child with the blood of the hearts of kangaroos and wallabies. Two sisters came upon the campsite while he was out hunting, and suckled the child, qujickly hiding up a tree when they heard the elder Ngagangunu returning. He got the child to suck the blood of a wallaby's heart, but having just been fed breast milk, he vomited the white milk, as Ngagangunu immediately observed. Aroused, he crept about the surrounding bushland wielding a large erection, searching for the female culprits. His mighty penis made the younger sister break out in uncontrolled laughter, revealing their hiding place. He pulled them down from the tree and tried to copulate with both, unsuccessfully. For her found himself poking, nothing.

A legend which the Mamu share with the Ngajan concerns the origins of Lake Euramoo.

== History ==
The split between the Dyirbal and Mamu, to judge from the linguistic data, occurred relatively recently. When the Mamu first encountered white men, they imagined that they were meeting up with the reincarnated ghosts of their ancestors, and thus called them (guwuy:'spirit of a deceased person'). Massacres, opium and disease such as measles, influenza and smallpox decimated the tribe.

In the late 1870s and early 1880s, European redcedar cutters and Chinese that were prospecting for gold arrived in the region. The Chinese often used Aboriginals as labourers and paid them in opium, one of the key factors that led to the virtual extinction, save for a few remnants, of these rainforest peoples like the Mamu. The explorer Christie Palmerston, recalled that, while pushing out from Mourilyan Harbour in late 1883, he and his Melanasian manservant encounter a 'large mob' of 'cute creatures', Mamu aborigines, coming down the North Johnstone River who were unaware of 'the power of resistance the white man had'. He therefore made them submit to 'the usual ordeal' since reasoning was beyond them, and 'drilled them' with rifle-fire while his kanaka laid into them with a long bush knife, effecting 'terrible havoc'.

== Social system ==
The Mamu tribes comprised 5 'hordes' or subgroups: Waɽibara, Dulgubarra, Bagiɽgabara, Dyiɽibara and Mandubara. (Note: -barra is a derivational suffix in Dyirbal denoting 'person or thing associated with'. (Dixon 1982:45)) The Waɽibara lived in the densely forested deep gorges of the Upper Johnstone River, as the word wari (deep gorge) reveals. The Dulgubarra lay in the thick scrub country (dulgu)further south down the Johnston. The Dyiɽibara lived near the present day town of Mourilyan. The Mandubara lived on the South Johnstone River. The Dulgubarra, or "The Cassowary Tribe", were distinguished by the red and yellow plumage adorning their head-dresses.

== Native title ==
On 31 October 2013 the descendants of the Mamu people had their claim to native title in the area when the Federal Court Tribunal recognised their exclusive rights to over 75 square kilometres (29 mi^{2}) of land, and non-exclusive rights to roughly 645 square kilometres (249 mi^{2}) of land, extending from Kurrimine to Jogo and Millaa Millaa.

== Some words ==
Mamu has some words that convey a whole concept requiring a phrase in English in just one verb:

- wayngu: to be busy looking after one's children
- ngulbuny: green (tree) ant, believed to have the same curative powers that it has among the Yidinji people

== Sources ==
- "AIATSIS map of Indigenous Australia". AIATSIS. 28 July 2023.
- Dixon, R. M. W. (1972). The Dyirbal Language of North Queensland. Cambridge University Press. ISBN 978-0-521-08510-6.
- Dixon, R. M. W. (1982). "Problems in Dyirbal Dialectology". In John A., Anderson (ed.). Language Form and Linguistic Variation: Papers dedicated to Angus McIntosh. John Benjamins Publishing. pp. 43–74. ISBN 978-9-027-28649-9.
- Dixon, R. M. W. (2011). Searching for Aboriginal Languages: Memoirs of a Field Worker. Cambridge University Press. ISBN 978-1-108-02504-1.
- Evans, Raymond (2010). Peters-Little, Frances; Curthoys, Ann; Docker, John (eds.). Passionate Histories: Myth, Memory and Indigenous Australia. Australian National University. pp. 9–38. ISBN 978-1-921-66665-0.
- "Livable Cassowary Coast". Government of Queensland. 2016.
- Parsons, Liam (1 November 2013). "Aboriginal elders celebrate native title ruling near Innisfail in Far North Queensland". The Cairns Post.
