= Wanjuru =

Aboriginal Australian people

The Wanyuru were an indigenous Australian people of the state of Queensland.

== Name ==
The ethnonym is that recorded by Tindale, though the linguist Robert Dixon later affirmed that no tribal name is known for the people who spoke the Wañjurru language.

== Language ==
Wañurr(u), together with Yidiny and Gunggay, the latter spoken by the Gungganyji, were all dialects of the one language.

== Country ==
In Norman Tindale's estimation the Wanjuru's tribal lands covered some 200 square miles (520 km^{2}), from an area south of where the Russell River debouches into the Coral Sea down to Cooper Point and Innisfail. Like the other rainforest dwellers in this area, the Kunja, their inland extension lay about Babinda.

== Alternative name ==
- Wanjar

== Sources ==
- "AIATSIS map of Indigenous Australia". AIATSIS. 14 May 2024.
- Dixon, R. M. W. (2011). Searching for Aboriginal Languages: Memoirs of a Field Worker. Cambridge University Press. ISBN 978-1-108-02504-1.
- Dixon, R. M. W. (2015). Edible Gender, Mother-in-law Style, and Other Grammatical Wonders: Studies in Dyirbal, Yidiñ, and Warrgamay. Oxford University Press. ISBN 978-0-198-70290-0.
- Tindale, Norman Barnett (1974). "Wanjuru (QLD)". Aboriginal Tribes of Australia: Their Terrain, Environmental Controls, Distribution, Limits, and Proper Names. Australian National University. ISBN 978-0-708-10741-6.
