= Wulgurukaba =

The Wulgurukaba (also Wulgurugaba) are an overarching Aboriginal Australian seafaring cultural grouping of coastal north-east Queensland peoples, comprising the land and sea owning groups for Townsville areas, also Magnetic Island across Halifax Bay into the Great Barrier Reef, including the Palm Islands. The anthropologist Norman Tindale's 1940 and 1974 ethnographic surveys and mapping recorded the Wulgurukaba as a single regional grouping encompassing an estimated 1,000 square miles (2,600 km^{2}) of Townsvilles mainland coastal strip, offshore islands, and seas.

The name Wulgurukaba translates literally to "canoe people", derived from wulgurru (or ulgurru), the local term for a bark canoe, and the associative suffix -kaba. Wulgurukaba serves as an overarching regional designation for groups who spoke dialects of the Wulguru language and formed the southernmost part of the Southern Rainforest (Girringun) regional society, sharing social, linguistic, and totemic traditions with neighbouring groups including the Nyawaygi, Warrgamay, and Girramay.

== Distinguishing features ==
Wulgurukaba culture was characterised by maritime subsistence, open-water navigation, and inter-island travel across Halifax Bay and Cleveland Bay. Archaeological and ethnographic records document physical occupation through shell middens, ancient rock art, burial sites, and stone fish traps. They used 8-foot (2.4 m) bark canoes, nets, and turtle-shell fishhooks (minggi) to harvest fish, sea turtles, and dugong, and participated in the trepang (bêche-de-mer) fishery.

Linguistically, the Wulguru language was an eastern Pama–Nyungan language characterised by two laminal stop series, contrastive vowel length, and word-final nasals (/m/, /ŋ/). Unlike northern rainforest neighbours, it lacked noun classes or grammatical genders. It formed a dialect continuum ranging from conservative insular varieties on the Palm Islands (Buluguyban and Mulgu) to mainland varieties (durugal) around Townsville, which exhibited initial consonant dropping (/y/, /w/, /n/).

Traditional land tenure was held by localized estate groups carrying the regional suffix -barra ("people of") including:

- Manbarra (or Manbarra Wulgurukaba): the Palm Island group (Dhanu mira);
- Gurambilbarra (or Gurambilbarra Wulgurukaba): Cape Pallarenda (Gurambil), the Townsville mainland, and Magnetic Island;
- Dhulginbarra: the scrub country (dhulgin) west of Townsville along the Bohle River corridor

Ethnohistorical and judicial records, for instance, treat "Gurambilbarra Wulgurukaba" and "Manbarra Wulgurukaba" as two distinct land and sea owning groups within the overarching cultural bloc. The Gurambilbarra sea country meets the Manbarra marine boundary to the north.

== Contact history ==
In June 1770, James Cook on HMS Endeavour observed Aboriginal people using 8-foot bark canoes in coastal waters and traversing shallows between the mainland and Magnetic Island at low tide.

Non-Aboriginal settlement began at Townsville in 1861, followed by pastoral expansion, dispossession, and frontier violence. In the 1880s, Charles Price recorded vocabulary, ceremonial songs, and an Indigenous speaker's spoken text protesting killings by settlers (ganggay arra gina... gina margan). Further wordlists were published by Edward Micklethwaite Curr in 1886, Belgian researchers Houzé and Jacques in the late 19th century, and Ernest Gribble in 1932.

From the late 19th century onward, many Wulgurukaba were forcibly removed under the Aboriginals Protection and Restriction of the Sale of Opium Act 1897 to government settlements, particularly Palm Island. In 1938, anthropologist Norman Tindale recorded genealogies on Palm Island and mapped the regional "Wulgurukaba" boundary, noting the constituent designations "Mun-ba-rah" and "Korambelbara". Linguistic fieldwork was later undertaken on the mainland varieties by Peter Sutton in 1970 (recording Nhawalgaba) and Tasaku Tsunoda between 1971 and 1972 (recording Gabilgara). Several families (aka descent groups) maintained continuous physical connection to their traditional estates through employment in commercial fishing and boating.

== See also ==
- Manbarra
- Gurambilbarra
- Wulguru language
