= Dyirbal people =

Australian Aboriginal people of northern Queensland

The Dyirbal, also called Jirrbal, are an Aboriginal Australian people living in northern Queensland, both one tribe (the Dyirbalŋan or 'Tully River blacks') and a group of related contiguous peoples included under that label as the Dyirbal tribes. They live on the upper Murray river of the Atherton Tableland. Their name is used as a generic term to refer specifically to one of eight groups, the others being Yidinji, Ngadyan, Mamu, Girramay, Wargamay, Waruŋu and Mbabaɽam. (Note: Dixon earlier in 1982 (1982:44) classified the Dyirbal-speakers into 6 groups, the five others being Girramay, Gulŋay, Jirru (Dyiru), Mamu and Ngajan)

== Language ==
Dyirbal belongs to the Dyirbalic branch of the Pama–Nyungan language family. It is one of several dialects, for Giramay, Mamu, Dyiru, Gulŋay, and Ngajan. It is an ergative language allowing words in the sentence in any order. It has four genders, classifying things as 'masculine' (bayi), 'feminine'(balan), 'edible'(non-flesh foods) (balam) or 'neuter' (bala). In addition to this, a dozen different markers could be added to any noun, indicating the precise location, distance or direction of what is being referred to. It also used to have a special mother-in-law language, called Dyalŋuy (Jalnguy), switching to it from everyday language (guwal) whenever one's mother-in-law was present, or, in the case of a woman, one's father-in-law.

== Country ==
They lived in the tropical rainforest much of which, apart from the coastal areas, was then cleared in order to facilitate banana plantations. Norman Tindale calculated that their tribal territory encompassed some 1,100 square miles (2,800 km^{2}), taking in the areas of Herberton southwards as far the headwaters of the Herbert River north of Cashmere. Their eastern boundary lay around Tully Falls. Ravenshoe, Millaa Millaa, and Woodleigh were also developed on Dyirbal land.

A myth still current appears to explain the difference between the highland flora and that of the coastal zone: The tall upcountry forest members, trees like bull oak, water gum and black walnut had the idea of advancing eastwards to set down roots along the coast, but their endeavour was obstructed by the mangroves, which fashioned boomerangs from their roots and fought the arboreal invaders off so that the lowlands are clear of such species. In 1963 a large part of Girramay country, including sacred sites, was bulldozed, dynamited and fenced in by King Ranch, the American pastoral company, after it obtained a lease from the Queensland Government, paying $2 per acre for forest, and $5 per acre for scrubland. Sacred sites like Yungigali, which in a Dreamtime legend was where a dog was transmogrified into a rock, were devastated.

== Society ==
The Dyirbal consisted of several hordes, such as the Njirma, who were located at Ravenshoe.

Each of the clans composing the Dyirbal had four sections, with a corresponding totem:

- The ḑigungara section's dominant totem was ḑaban (black eel)
- The gurguru section's dominant totem was guruŋgul (kite hawk)
- The gurgila section's dominant totem was mubaray (large eel)
- The garbawruru section's dominant totem was guriḑala (eaglehawk)

The marriage rules regarding the four sections were as follows:

- ḑigungara men had to marry gurguru women. Their offspring were gurgila.
- gurguru men had to marry ḑigungara women. Their offspring were garbawruru.
- gurgila men had to marry garbawruru. Their offspring were ḑigungara.
- garbawruru men had to marry gurgila. Their offspring were gurguru.

== History ==
The first contact with whites goes back to 1848, at which time it has been estimated that each dialect group in the generic Djirbal tribal societies had around 500 members. Dixon estimates the total numbers at 5,000, which, within five decades of white settlement, indiscriminate shootings and disease, had the impact of leading to their decimation to something like 10% of their original strength by the end of the 19th century. They, with the related Girramaygans, eventually gathered together south of Tully in the Upper Murray, tolerated by settlers, one of whom is reported to have said in the 1920s that: 'There are no bad Aborigines left here: they've all been shot'. One pioneer was nicknamed scrub-itch (gubarrngubarr) because he adopted the habit of shooting at aborigines if he came across them dancing at their initiations corroborees. One Aboriginal woman who kept house with 'Scrub-itch' was ordered one day to fetch eggs from a scrub hen nest, and he then shot her dead as she dug into one of their breeding mounds. He had gotten bored by her attentions. It was a habit of whites among the Upper Murray tribes to take aboriginal concubines and, when they got pregnant, slaughter their own children.

=== Encounter with Captain Cook ===
Either Dyirbal collective memory, or the ingenuity of one of its last speakers, Chloe Grant, (Note: Dixon writes (2011, p.154): I remembered the story of Captain Cook, who'd never been anywhere near Murray Upper. If this could be made up within two hundred years, what chance was there of an accurate account of the eruption being handed on for ten millennia? But there are important differences. The "Captain Cook" bit was made up by Chloe - no one else at Murray Upper would have approved; it had no tradition. She was telling of the first white/black contact experience, and had called the first white man Captain Cook because the white people said he was the first. The Lakes story, however, was an established legend, known to several tribes.) tells of an incident conserved from the Girramaygan tribe. Were it true, it would mean that they had conserved for 200 years a clear memory of the day James Cook, sailing along the Cassowary Coast Region, set foot on the shore of the territory at what is now Cardwell, Queensland. The anecdote was collected by the specialist in Australian Aboriginal languages, Robert M. W. Dixon, from his informant Chloe Grant in 1963–4. Chloe Grant was born of an Irish father and a Girramaygan mother in 1903, and died in 1974. According to her account, Cook, whom the natives took to be a spirit because of his white skin, beached his boat (warrjan, literally a log vessel or raft). The encounter consisted of four distinct moments: at first, Cook and members of his crew took out pipes, lit them, and offered tobacco to the tribe. The sight left them perplexed as they mulled the meaning of the burning object and smoke in the Europeans' mouths. Then Cook boiled a billy of tea and offered them a drink, which they rebuffed as just dirty water. At this point, Cook laid out a johnnycake on the coals of the fire he had lit, flipped it over and back until it was fully cooked, broke off pieces from it, and offered to share it with his hosts. The food Cook had prepared resembled their native walnut cakes (wila), but smelt stale and was thus rejected. At this point, Cook made them some boiled meat and beef, and tasting it, they found it edible.

Finally Cook readied his boat for departure, and the tribe was disconcerted. For them, the encounter was one with their ancestors from the other-world, who might offer them counsel. They pleaded with him to stay over: "Father, father, come here, come back to us" (Nguma, nguma, gawu bani, banaga), to no avail.

=== 20th century ===
In the early 20th century, many families were forcibly removed from their country and placed in the Aboriginal reserve that also served as a penal colony on Great Palm Island.

== Cannibalistic episode ==
The Dyirbal tribes did not engage in cannibalism in order just to eat people. It had a punitive retaliatory function, especially with regard to people judged to have violated native law. The last instance occurred in 1940, when Mick Bulbu (tribal name Burburra) was killed by Jumbulu for numerous violations of tribal law, and had part of his body cut up and eaten.

== Songs ==
Dyirbal songs are divided into dancing and love songs. The dancing style was called gama. One recorded by Robert Dixon from Wille Kelly on the outskirts of Ravenshoe takes as its theme the willie wagtail (Dyirbal: jigirrjigirr, or in the mother-in-law register of the language, burulabarra "he who belongs to the fighting ground"). This bird, unlike most, is classified as male, since they are believed to be the ghosts (guwuy) of mythical men, (Note: nearly all other birds are believed to be the spirits of dead women) and its method of fluttering its tail was likened to the dance, in shake-a-leg style (legs fixed in a position while the knees wobble) of an initiated man at a corroboree. It also conveyed the manner of a spirit moving in the otherworld. For the anthropologist, in its interweaving of native bird lore, customs and bush, it seemed, hauntingly, to embody the essence of North Queensland's traditional world. The first lines, repeated throughout the song, run:

jígirrjigírr ngarrú banggány
jígirrjigírr ngarrú banggány.

== Alternative names ==
- Chirpa
- Chirpalji
- Choolngai (Wakara exonym)
- Djirbal
- Dyirbaldyi
- Dyirbalngan
- Njirma
- Tjirbal

Source: Tindale 1974, pp. 167–168

== Some words ==
- The words for 'go up' vary according to the action or object ascended:wandin, 'go up river'; waynyjin, 'go up anything else, except a tree, where bilinyu is used, or more specifically, bumiranyu, to rope oneself up a tree. If one's mother-in-law or a close relative of hers were present, one would substitute these terms with a different verb, dayubin.
- gurawarrabajanmigurm. A Tully River toponym. The literal meaning is, 'where a man bit the vaginal lips of a woman when he should not have.'
- wanggurinyu. To crouch down on one's heels with knees off the ground.
- wugumbanyu. A person huddled up, arms embracing the legs, with knees touching the chin: of old people, struggling to keep warm in cold weather.
- wuyan (Girramay). to keep removing elements of a group or pile, till almost none remain of that class, as the mythical form of the cassowary did in wringing the necks of children it found, till nearly none were left. (Note: In Dyirbal lore, the cassowary lost this nasty habit when scrub wallaby persuaded it to be deloused. Having lice picked off makes one sleepy, and as the wallabies cleaned it, the cassowary dozed off, and they cut off his hands with a hatchet, so it could no longer choke children.)

== In film ==
Fabio Cavadini and his brother Alessandro Cavadini made a short film called We Stop Here (released 1977) about the Dyirbal people, in particular the removal of some of the people to the penal colony on Palm Island, Queensland.

== Sources ==
- Dixon, R. M. W. (1972). The Dyirbal Language of North Queensland. Cambridge University Press. p. 351. ISBN 978-0-521-08510-6.
- Dixon, R. M. W. (1982). "Problems in Dyirbal Dialectology". In John A., Anderson (ed.). Language Form and Linguistic Variation: Papers dedicated to Angus McIntosh. John Benjamins Publishing. pp. 43–74. ISBN 978-9-027-28649-9.
- Dixon, R. M. W. (1991). A changing language situation: The decline of Dyirbal, 1963-1989. Vol. 20. pp. 183–200. doi:10.1017/S0047404500016262. ISBN 978-0-521-08510-6. JSTOR 4168229. S2CID 145363699.
- Dixon, R. M. W. (2011). Searching for Aboriginal Languages: Memoirs of a Field Worker. Cambridge University Press. ISBN 978-1-108-02504-1.
- Dixon, R. M. W. (2015). Edible Gender, Mother-in-Law Style, and Other Grammatical Wonders: Studies in Dyirbal, Yidiñ, and Warrgamay. Oxford University Press. ISBN 978-0-191-00742-2.
- Dixon, R. M. W.; Koch, Grace (1996). Dyirbal Song poetry: The Oral Literature of a Rainforest People. Queensland University Press. ISBN 978-0-702-22593-2.
- Harrison, Rodney; Williamson, Christine (2004). "'Too Many Captain Cooks?': An archaeology of Aboriginal Australia after 1788". In Harrison, Rodney; Williamson, Christine (eds.). After Captain Cook: The Archaeology of the Recent Indigenous Past in Australia. Rowman Altamira. pp. 1–13. ISBN 978-0-759-10657-4.
- Plaster, Keith; Polinsky, Maria (2007). "Women are not dangerous things: Gender and categorization" (PDF). Harvard Working Papers in Linguistics. 12: 1–44.
- Tindale, Norman Barnett (1974). "Djirubal (QLD)". Aboriginal Tribes of Australia: Their Terrain, Environmental Controls, Distribution, Limits, and Proper Names. Australian National University Press.
- Wohlgemuth, Jan (2001). "Dyirbal in assimilation — social surroundings and grammatical change of present-day Dyirbal Or: What did actually become of the language DIXON described in 1968?". linguist.de.
