= Yuru language =

Extinct Australian Aboriginal language of Queensland

Yuru
- Juru
- Native to: Australia
- Region: Queensland
- Ethnicity: Juru people
- Extinct: after 1886
- Language family: Pama–Nyungan: Nyawaygic; Yuru

Language codes
- ISO 639-3: ljx
- Glottolog: yuru1264
- AIATSIS: E62

Yuru (Juru) is an extinct Australian Aboriginal language formerly spoken at the mouth of the Burdekin River in the state of Queensland. A single vocabulary collected by John O'Connor and published in The Australian Race by Edward Curr is the only source on the language.

== Classification ==
Yuru has been classified as Nyawaygic.

== Vocabulary ==
English gloss	O'Connor vocabulary
Kangaroo	arragoo
Opossum	onehunger
Tame dog	oodoodoo
Emu	karboonmillery
Black duck	hoorooburry
Wood duck	culburh
Pelican	dooroomully
Laughing jackass	karcoobura
Native companion	kooroogowgun
White cockatoo	bunginna
Crow	wombugah
Egg	gunnoo
Track of a foot	yulmun
Fish	weambura
Lobster	boogurrie
Crayfish	inundah
Mosquito	hoonhoono
Fly	nin
Snake	boongi (carpet)
The Blacks	dulgooh
A Blackfellow	dulgooh
A Black woman	tudgegun
2 Blacks	blarin dulgooh
3 Blacks	wungoo dulgooh
Nose	wuneary
Hand	wurrumby
One	warrin
Two	blarin
Three	wungoo
Four	murragi
Father	abah
Mother	yunguma
Elder sister	kooda
Elder brother	kudun
A young man	deebahgul
An old man	nuganugamun
An old woman	bundeyun
A baby	cowla
A White man	yuarroo
Children	moolaramoo
Head	karboyan
Eye	deebara
Ear	kungun
Mouth	unga
Teeth	dingull
Hair of the head	targuinn
Beard	talba
Thunder	burrahroo
Grass	narahminie
Tongue	dulling
Stomach	boonda
Breasts	dulnbinn
Thigh	duburrin
Foot	dingooburra
Bone	mimmoon
Blood	queeberry
Skin	mindeer
Fat	boongaroo
Bowels	yaboo
Excrement	guno
War-spear	woolunbura
Wommera or throwing-stick	buddurrie
Shield	poodda poodda
Tomahawk	oolun
Canoe	karbeyal
Sun	mulloun
Moon	waboonburra
Star	dirilger
Light	baragunna
Dark	wulhurrie
Cold	orbehgun
Heat	moondo moondo
Day	unbur
Fire	neebull
Water	dunjun
Smoke	doongin
Ground	dingur
Wind	uinne
Rain	marroo
Wood	moora
Stone	bungil
Camp	midera
Yes	yu yow
No	karbil
I	uda
You	ninda
Bark	bulgun
Good	boongoon
Bad	diga
Sweet	goondi
Food	dungee, ogoo
Hungry	garoo
Thirsty	armboo yulburana
Eat	dulgee ogoo
Sleep	boog oggba
Drink	kudge ogoo
Walk	warin
See	na
Sit	duri
Yesterday	dirrierih
To-day	cudgin
To-morrow	burrigunda
Where are the Blacks?	ulba dalgul?
I don't know	carbilbrather
Plenty	murrgi
Big	yunga
Little	arbooro
Dead	walgoon
By-and-by	boodinhi
Come on	kooa
