= Mbabaram language =

Australian Aboriginal language

Mbabaram
- Barbaram
- Mbabaɽam
- Native to: Australia
- Region: Queensland
- Ethnicity: Mbabaram
- Extinct: 1972, with the death of Albert Bennett
- Language family: Pama–Nyungan: Paman; Southern Paman; Mbabaram

Language codes
- ISO 639-3: vmb
- Glottolog: mbab1239
- AIATSIS: Y115
- ELP: Mbabaram
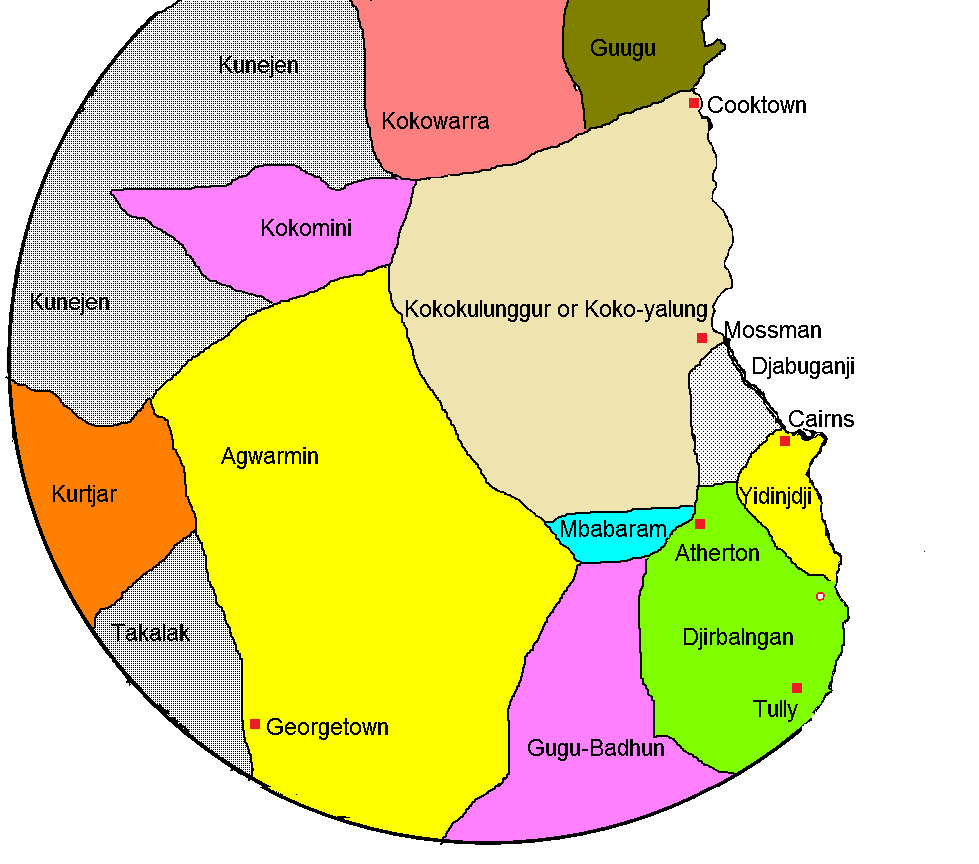
- Traditional lands of the Aboriginal peoples around Cairns; Mbabaram in cyan.

Mbabaram (Barbaram) is an extinct Australian Aboriginal language of north Queensland, traditionally spoken by the Mbabaram people. R. M. W. Dixon described his hunt for a native speaker of Mbabaram in his book Searching for Aboriginal Languages: Memoirs of a Field Worker. Most of what is known of the language is from Dixon's field research with speaker Albert Bennett.

Recordings are held in the audio collection of the Australian Institute of Aboriginal and Torres Strait Islander Studies.

== Classification ==
Mbabaram is a Pama-Nyungan language, specifically belonging to the Paman group.

As part of his theory that the Mbabaram tribe (among others of the region) were of part Tasmanoid origin, Norman Tindale noted the Mbabaram language appeared strongly isolated, but R. M. W. Dixon stated the more reasonable view was that Mbabaram was very recognizably related to the languages of the region.

== Geographic distribution ==
Mbabaram was spoken by the Mbabaram tribe in Queensland, southwest of Cairns (17°20′S 145°0′E). Their territory was bordered by the Walsh River in the north, and included the present localities of Irvinebank, Petford and Lappa.

The nearby languages were Agwamin, Djangun (Kuku-Yalanji), Muluridji (Kuku-Yalanji), Djabugay, Yidiny, Ngadjan (Dyirbal), Mamu (Dyirbal), Jirrbal (Dyirbal), Girramay (Dyirbal), and Warungu. Each language was mutually intelligible with at least its immediate neighbours, but Mbabaram was not mutually intelligible with any of them. Because of the difficulty of the language for other tribes, Mbabaram speakers would tend to learn their languages rather than the other way round.

== Phonology ==
=== Vowels ===
	Front	Central	Back
Close	i	ɨ	u
Open-mid	ɛ		ɔ
Open		a	

=== Consonants ===
	Peripheral		Laminal		Apical	
	Bilabial	Velar	Palatal	Dental	Alveolar	Retroflex
Plosive	b	ɡ ɡʷ	ɟ	d̪	d dʷ	
Nasal	m	ŋ	ɲ	n̪	n nʷ	
Lateral					l	
Rhotic					r	ɻ
Semivowel	w		j			

=== Phonological history ===
==== Vowels ====
Mbabaram would have originally had three vowels, /i/, /a/ and /u/, with a length distinction in the initial, stressed syllable. Several changes occurred to add /ɛ/, /ɨ/ and /ɔ/ to the system:

- [ɔ] developed from original */a/ in the second syllable of a word if the word began with */ɡ/, */ŋ/, or */wu/, e.g. */ganda/ > /ndɔ/ "burn", */gudaga/ > /dɔg/ "tame dog"
- [ɛ] developed from original */a/ in the second syllable of a word if the word began with */ɟ/, e.g. */djana/ > /nɛ-/ "sit", */djiba/ > /bɛ/ "liver" (It may have also occurred with /ɲ/ or /ji/, but no examples are known.)
- [ɨ] developed from original */u/ in the second syllable of a word if the word began with */ɟ/, */ɲ/, or */j/ e.g. */djambul/ > /mbɨl/ "two", */yundu/ > /ndɨ/ "you"
- [ɨ] developed from original */i/ in the second syllable of a word if the word began with */ɡ/, */ŋ/, or */w/ e.g. */gabirri/ > /bɨrr/ "emu", */wanji/ > /njɨb/ "what"

The first consonant and vowel of each word was then dropped, leaving the distribution of /ɔ ɛ ɨ/ unpredictable.

== Vocabulary ==
- dog (dog), unrelated to the English word
- gungdg (kookaburra)
- yú (fish)

=== Word for "dog" ===
Mbabaram is known in linguistic circles for a striking coincidence in its vocabulary. When Dixon began to study the language, he asked for several basic nouns, including the word for "dog". Bennett supplied the Mbabaram translation, dog. Dixon suspected that Bennett had misunderstood the question or that Bennett's knowledge of Mbabaram had been tainted by decades of using English, but the Mbabaram word for "dog" was in fact dúg, pronounced almost identically to the Australian English word (compare true cognates such as Yidiny gudaga, Dyirbal guda, Djabugay gurraa and Guugu Yimidhirr gudaa, for example).

The similarity is a complete coincidence: the English and Mbabaram languages developed on opposite sides of the planet over several millennia. This and other false cognates have been cited by typological linguist Bernard Comrie as a caution against deciding that languages are related based on a small number of lexical comparisons.

== Bibliography ==
- AIATSIS. "Collections". aiatsis.gov.au.
- Black, Paul (2004). "The Failure of the Evidence of Shared Innovations in Cape York peninsula". In Bowern, Claire; Koch, Harold James (eds.). Australian languages: classification and the comparative method. Amsterdam Studies in the Theory and History of Linguistic Science. Series 4, Current Issues in Linguistic Theory. Vol. 249. John Benjamins. p. 264. ISBN 978-1-58811-512-6.
- Comrie, Bernard (1987). "Introduction". The World's Major Languages. Milton Park, Abingdon, Oxon; New York, NY: Routledge. p. 6. doi:10.4324/9781315644936-1. ISBN 978-1-315-64493-6.
- Dixon, R. M. W. (1966). "Mbabaram: A Dying Australian Language". Bulletin of the School of Oriental and African Studies, University of London. 29 (1): 97–121. doi:10.1017/S0041977X00060833. ISSN 0041-977X. JSTOR 611096.
- Dixon, R. M. W. (1972). The Dyirbal Language of North Queensland. Cambridge University Press. p. 348. ISBN 978-0-521-08510-6.
- Dixon, R. M. W. (1984). Searching for Aboriginal Languages: Memoirs of a Field Worker. Cambridge library collection. Linguistics. Cambridge: Cambridge University Press. p. 208. ISBN 978-1-108-02504-1.
- Dixon, Robert. M. W. (1989). Searching for Aboriginal Languages: Memoirs of a Field Worker (2nd ed.). University of Chicago Press. ISBN 978-0226154305.
- Dixon, R. M. W. (1991). "Mbabaram". In Dixon, R. M. W.; Blake, B. J. (eds.). Handbook of Australian Languages. Vol. 4. Melbourne: Oxford University Press.
- Dixon, R. M. W. (2002). Australian Languages: Their Nature and Development. Cambridge University Press. ISBN 978-0521473781.
- "Glottolog 5.3 – Mbabaram". glottolog.org.
