= Biyaygiri =

Aboriginal Australian people

The Biyaygiri, also known as Bandjin, were an Aboriginal Australian people of northern Queensland.

== Language ==
The language of the Biyaygiri was Biyay, a dialect of Warrgamay. The last speaker of the language was Nora Boyd, who enabled Robert Dixon to supplement what little was known of the dialect before she died at age 95.

== Country ==
The Biyaygiri were the Indigenous people of Hinchinbrook Island, with a continental foothold on the area around Lucinda Point. Norman Tindale estimated their lands as encompassing about 2,000 square miles (5,200 km^{2}).

== Social organisation ==
Some uncertainty exists as to whether the Biyay speakers on Hinchinbrook and the Lucinda Point were the same tribe. The latter called themselves Biaigin, and may have been tribally distinct. Those on Hinchinbrook had a four-class marriage system:

- Koorkeela
- Kookooroo
- Woongo
- Wooitcheroo

Biyaygiri furnished some of the major trade goods of the continental area adjacent to their island, and among those mainland tribes the nautilus necklaces, and melo shells they collected and worked came to be known by one of the Hinchinbrook tribal ethnonyms, bandjin.

== History of contact ==
Hinchenbrook Island was first occupied by whites around 1863. The island was ethnically cleansed just under a decade later. Robert Dixon writes that an initial attempt to established a mission, where the Biyaygiri might have found some protection, was undertaken by the Reverend E. Fuller in 1870, but his sojourn in the area lasted only five months, during which the Biyaygiri kept their distance.

In retrospect, the Biyaygiri might have done well to seek his protection. In 1872, Sub-Inspector Robert Johnstone - who was convinced that there was only one real way to "teach the Aborigines a lesson" - led a party of police and troopers who beat a cordon across the island and cornered almost the whole tribe on a headland. Those who were not massacred on land were shot as they attempted to swim away.

A slightly different version is provided by newspapers of the period. Fuller's mission was undertaken in 1874, two years later than Johnstone's cleansing of the area with the assistance of the Australian native police. The Biyaygiri had been decimated before Fuller's arrival and he spent three weeks trying to turn up Aboriginal people on the island without finding a single native person there.

== Alternative names ==
- Bandji (incorrect)
- Bandyin, Banjin
- Biaigiri
- Bijai (language name)
- Bundjin
- Kunyin
- Uradig

Source: Tindale 1974, p. 163

== Some words ==
- kooin (white man)
- tonga (father)
- wooyou (tame dog)
- yappo (mother)

Source: Armstrong & Murray 1886, p. 420

== Sources ==
- "The Abandonment of Gilberton". The Queenslander. Brisbane. 4 April 1874. p. 10 – via Trove.
- Armstrong, M; Murray, John (1886). "Hinchinbrook Island and the mainland adjacent" (PDF). In Curr, Edward Micklethwaite (ed.). The Australian race: its origin, languages, customs, place of landing in Australia and the routes by which it spread itself over the continent. Vol. 2. Melbourne: J. Ferres. pp. 418–421.
- Dixon, R. M. W. (1966). "Mbabaram: a dying Australian language". Bulletin of the School of Oriental and African Studies. 29: 97–121. doi:10.1017/S0041977X00060833. S2CID 162853579.
- Dixon, R. M. W. (2011). Searching for Aboriginal Languages: Memoirs of a Field Worker. Cambridge University Press. ISBN 978-1-108-02504-1.
- "Hinchinbrook". Government of Queensland. 13 April 2015.
- "Mission to the Aborigines". The Queenslander. Brisbane. 14 February 1874. p. 3 – via Trove.
- Tindale, Norman Barnett (1974). "Bandjin (QLD)". Aboriginal Tribes of Australia: Their Terrain, Environmental Controls, Distribution, Limits, and Proper Names. Australian National University Press.
