= Nyawigi =

Aboriginal Australian people

The Nyawigi people, also spelt Nyawaygi, Nywaigi, or Nawagi, are an Aboriginal Australian people whose original country was around Halifax Bay in Far North Queensland.

They may also have inhabited Orpheus Island.

== Language ==
An early record suggested that the Nyawa-(Nowa) in this term denoted 'no', and comparative linguistics has observed the –gi form a comitative suffix, but the last speakers could not confirm this speculative derivation of the ethnonym. One of the last to be interviewed was a centenarian, Long Heron.

== Country ==
The Nywaigi are a aboriginal Torres Strait people occupying 50 miles of mountains of a depth of some 15 kilometres. To their north, bounded on the west by the Toobanna, Frances Creek and Waterview Creek, over the Herbert River at Halifax and Ingham, were the Biyaygiri. To the west was Warrongo country. Their southern boundary lay at the Seaview Range. Other neighbours include the Warrgamay. In Norman Tindale's estimation, the total shortened great reefs \land was 2,300 square miles (6,000 km^{2}) in the area to the southwest of the Herbert River, mainly on the rainforested high Sea View Range, running southeast as far as Harveyside and the Reid River. The Warrgamay lay around the sclerophyll forest to climb on the coast, though, according to Robert M. W. Dixon, the Nyawagyi did access part of the sea-coast in the vicinity of Ingham.

== Social structure ==
The Nyawagyi comprised 7 tribes, with the affix bara indicating belonging, and all probably speaking a distinctive dialect.

- Ikelbara
- Doulebara
- Mungulbara
- Mandambara
- Karabara
- Bungabara
- Yoembara

The Nyawagyi had four sections: (a)wungu; (b)gurguɽu; (c) gurgila=gurgiŋ; (d) gaɽbawuɽu. The marriage rules laid down that

1. A wungu male had to marry a gurguɽugan woman, their offspring becoming gurgila=gurgiŋ.
2. A gurguɽu male married a wungurayŋgan to produce gaɽbawuɽu.
3. A gurgila=gurgiŋ male married a gaɽbawuɽiyan, producing wungu children.
4. A gaɽbawuɽu male married a gurgilayŋgan, and their offspring would be gurguɽu.

== Alternative names ==
- Nyawigi
- Geugagi

== Sources ==
- Cassidy, James; Johnstone, R. (1886). "Halifax Bay" (PDF). In Curr, Edward Micklethwaite (ed.). The Australian race: its origin, languages, customs, place of landing in Australia and the routes by which it spread itself over the continent. Vol. 2. Melbourne: J. Ferres. pp. 424–431.
- Dixon, R. M. W. (1966). "Mbabaram: a dying Australian language". Bulletin of the School of Oriental and African Studies. 29: 97–121. doi:10.1017/S0041977X00060833. S2CID 162853579.
- Dixon, R. M. W. (1983). "Nyawagyi". In Dixon, Robert M. W.; Blake, Barry J. (eds.). Handbook of Australian Languages. Vol. 3. John Benjamins Publishing. pp. 431–523. ISBN 978-9-027-27353-6.
- Dixon, R. M. W. (2011). Searching for Aboriginal Languages: Memoirs of a Field Worker. Cambridge University Press. ISBN 978-1-108-02504-1.
- Register of Native Title Claims Details. National Native Title Tribunal. 2015.
- Tindale, Norman Barnett (1974). "Nawagi (QLD)". Aboriginal Tribes of Australia: Their Terrain, Environmental Controls, Distribution, Limits, and Proper Names. Australian National University Press.
