= False cognate =

Words that look or sound alike, but are not related

False cognates are pairs of words that seem to be cognates because of similar sounds or spelling and meaning, but have different etymologies; they can be within the same language or from different languages, even within the same family. For example, the English word dog and the Mbabaram word dog have exactly the same meaning and very similar pronunciations, but by complete coincidence. Likewise, English much and Spanish mucho came by their similar meanings via completely different Proto-Indo-European roots, and same for English have and Spanish haber. This is different from false friends, which are similar-sounding words with different meanings, and may or may not be cognates. Within a language, if they are spelled the same, they are homographs; if they are pronounced the same, they are homophones. Cross-linguistic or interlingual homographs or homophones sometimes include cognates; non-cognates may more specifically be called homographic or homophonic noncognates.

Even though false cognates lack a common root, there may still be an indirect connection between them (for example by phono-semantic matching or folk etymology).

== Phenomenon ==
The term "false cognate" is sometimes misused to refer to false friends, but the two phenomena are distinct. False friends occur when two words in different languages or dialects look similar, but have different meanings. While some false friends are also false cognates, many are genuine cognates (see False friends § Causes). For example, English pretend and French prétendre "to claim" are false friends, but not false cognates, as they have the same origin.

== "Mama and papa" type ==
The basic kinship terms mama and papa constitute a special case of false cognates; many languages share words of similar form and meaning for these kinship terms, but due to common processes of language acquisition rather than relatedness of the languages.

== Examples ==
Note: Some etymologies may be simplified to avoid overly long descriptions.

=== Within English ===
Term 1	Etymology 1	Term 2	Etymology 2
day	Old English dæġ << Proto-Germanic *dagaz << Proto-Indo-European *dʰeǵʰ-	diary	Latin diārium << dies ("day") << Proto-Italic *djēm << PIE *dyḗws ("heaven")
island	Middle English iland << Old English īeġland << Proto-Germanic *awjōlandą	isle	Middle English ile << Old French i(s)le << Latin insula
(government) policy	Middle English policie << Old French policie << Late Latin politia << Ancient Greek politeía	(insurance) policy	French police << Italian polizza << Medieval Latin apodissa << Ancient Greek apódeixis

=== Between English and other languages ===
English term	English etymology	Foreign term	Foreign etymology
bad	Possibly from OE bæddel ("hermaphrodite, effeminate man") << PGmc *bad- ("defile")	Persian بد, bad	Old Iranian *wata-
better	OE betera	Persian بهتر, behtar, Hindi बहतर, bahatar	به (beh, "good") + تر (-tar, "-er")
bone	ME bon << OE bān "bone, tusk, or hard animal tissue"	Japanese 骨 hone ("bone") (Note: If rendaku is used, then the word "hone" will sound like "bone.")	Proto-Japonic *pəney
cinder	OE sinder << PGmc *sendra- "slag" << PIE *sendhro- "coagulating fluid"	French cendre ("ash")	Latin cinerem << PIE *ken- ("to arise, begin")
day	OE dæġ << PGmc *dagaz << PIE *dʰeǵʰ-	Latin dies ("day") and descendants	Proto-Italic *djēm << PIE *dyḗws ("heaven")
desert	Latin dēserō ("to abandon") << ultimately PIE **seh₁- ("to sow")	Ancient Egyptian Deshret (refers to the land not flooded by the Nile)	from dšr (red)
dog	OE docga or dogga	Mbabaram dog ("dog")	Proto-Pama-Nyungan *gudaga
emoticon	emotion + icon	Japanese 絵文字 (emoji)	絵 (e) ("picture") + 文字 (moji) ("character")
fire	OE fȳr PGmc *fōr ~ *fun- << PIE *péh₂wr̥	Thai ไฟ ("fire")	Proto-Tai *wɤjᴬ ("fire")
have	Middle English haven << OE habban ("to have") << Proto-West Germanic *habbjan << Proto-Germanic *habjaną ("to have"), durative of *habjaną ("to lift, take up") << PIE *kh₂pyéti present tense of *keh₂p- ("to take, seize, catch").	Corsican avè ("to have")	Latin habēre, present active infinitive of habeō << Proto-Italic *habēō << PIE *gʰeh₁bʰ- ("to grab").
hollow	OE holh << PGmc *holhwo-	Lake Miwok hóllu	
much	OE myċel << PGmc *mikilaz << PIE *meǵa- ("big, stout, great")	Spanish mucho ("much")	Latin multus ("many")
saint	Latin sanctus << PIE *seh₂k- ("to sanctify") via French	Sanskrit sant and descendants	sat ("truth, reality, essence")
shark	Middle English shark from uncertain origin	Chinese 鲨 (shā)	Named as its crude skin is similar to sand (沙 (shā))

=== Between other languages ===
Term 1	Etymology 1	Term 2	Etymology 2
French feu ("fire")	Latin focus	German Feuer ("fire")	PGmc *fōr ~ *fun- << PIE *péh₂wr̥
French nuque ('nape')	Latin nucha, from Arabic نُخَاع nukhāʻ 'spinal marrow'	Hungarian nyak ('neck')	Proto-Uralic *ńᴕkkɜ 'neck'
German haben ('to have')	PG *habjaną << PIE *keh₂p- ("to grasp")	Latin habere ("to have") and descendants	PIE *gʰeh₁bʰ- ("to grab, to take")
Swedish göl ("pool")	PG *guljō	Salar göl ("pool")	Proto-Turkic *kȫl ("lake")
German Erdbeere ('strawberry')	Erd ('earth') + Beere ('berry')	Hungarian eper ('strawberry')	Proto-Ugric *äppärĕ-kə
German Haus ('house')	Proto-Germanic *hūsą	Hungarian ház ('house')	Proto-Uralic *kota
Hawaiian kahuna ('priest')	Proto-Polynesian *tupuŋa	Hebrew כהן (kohen) ('priest')	Proto-West Semitic *kāhin-
Hungarian nő ('woman')	Proto-Uralic *niŋä	Mandarin Chinese 女 (nǚ) ('woman')	Proto-Sino-Tibetan *naq
Inuktitut ᖃᔭᖅ (kayak)	Proto-Eskimo *qayaʀ	Turkish kayık ('small boat')	Old Turkic kayguk << Proto-Turkic kay- ("to slide, to turn")
Mayaimi Mayaimi (Big water)		Hebrew מים mayim ("water")	Proto-Semitic *māy-
Japanese ありがとう arigatō ("thank you")	Clipping of 有難う御座います "arigatō gozaimasu" ("(I) am thankful") << 有難く "arigataku" << 有難い "arigatai" ("thankful, appreciated") << Old Japanese 有難斯 "arigatasi" ("difficult to be")	Portuguese obrigado ("thank you")	Literally "obliged" << Latin obligātus
Hindustani (Hindi-Urdu) मज़ा / مزہ (Mazah, "Fun")	From Classical Persian مزہ, ultimately from Proto-Indo-European *meh_{2}k.	Hindustani (Hindi-Urdu) मज़ाक़ / مذاق (Mazaaq, "Prank/Joke/Fun/Mockery")	From Arabic "مذاق" (Arabic->Persian->Hindustani).
Indonesian tanah ("ground")	Proto-Austronesian *tanaq	Aleut tanax̂ ("ground")	Cognate with Proto-Eskimo *nuna ("earth")
Tagalog bagay ("thing")	Proto-Malayo-Polynesian *bagay	Haitian Creole bagay ("thing")	Saint Dominican Creole French bagage
Hebrew שֵׁשׁ (šeš) ("six")	Proto-Semitic *šidṯum	Persian شش (šaš) ("six")	from Proto-Iranian *šwáš and ultimately from Proto-Indo-European *swéḱs
Dusun do ("of")		Portuguese do ("of")	Latin de
Spanish gusano ("worm, insect larva")	Uncertain, possibly from Latin cossus ("woodworm")	Russian гусеница (gusenica) ("caterpillar")	Proto-Slavic *ǫsěnica ("caterpillar")
Hebrew אֶלָּא (elá) ("but, except")	From Aramaic אלא, blend of אִן (ʾin "if") and לָא (lā "not")	Modern Greek αλλά (allá) ("but")	>>Ancient Greek ἀλλά, the neuter accusative plural of ἄλλος (“another, different”) >> PIE *h₂élyos
Thai พระ (phra) ("priest, monk")	From Sanskrit vara (वर): excellent, holy	Italian fra ("friar, monk, brother")	Latin frāter ("brother")
Hebrew אוֹ (ʔo) ("or")	Proto-Semitic *ʔaw	Spanish o ("or")	Latin aut
Scots Gaelic bò ("cow")	Proto-Indo-European gʷṓws	Vietnamese bò ("cow")	Proto-Vietic bɔː
Japanese あなた (anata) ("you")	Old Japanese spatial deictic anata ("that side, yonder") << a (distal demonstrative prefix) + nata (variant of kata "direction")	Arabic أَنْتَ (anta) ("you" [masc. sing.])	Proto-Semitic *ʼanta ("you") << *ʼan- (pronominal base) + *-ta (second person masculine marker)
Shona mangwana ("tomorrow")	Proto-Bantu *-ngwana	Spanish mañana ("tomorrow")	Latin māne ("early")

== False cognates used in the coinage of new words ==
The coincidental similarity between false cognates can sometimes be used in the creation of new words (neologization). For example, the Hebrew word דַּל dal ("poor") (which is a false cognate of the phono-semantically similar English word dull) is used in the new Israeli Hebrew expression אין רגע דל en rega dal (literally "There is no poor moment") as a phono-semantic matching for the English expression Never a dull moment.

Similarly, the Hebrew word דיבוב dibúv ("speech, inducing someone to speak"), which is a false cognate of (and thus etymologically unrelated to) the phono-semantically similar English word dubbing, is then used in the Israeli phono-semantic matching for dubbing. The result is that in Modern Hebrew, דיבוב dibúv means "dubbing".

== See also ==
- Areal feature
- Convergent evolution
- Equivalence
- Etymological fallacy
- False etymology
- False friend
- Linguistic interference (language transfer)
- Pseudoscientific language comparison
- Semantic change
- Sprachbund

== Works cited ==
- Chamizo-Domínguez, Pedro J. (2008), Semantics and Pragmatics of False Friends, New York/Oxon: Routledge
- Moss, Gillian (1992), "Cognate recognition: Its importance in the teaching of ESP reading courses to Spanish speakers", English for Specific Purposes, 11 (2): 141–158, doi:10.1016/s0889-4906(05)80005-5
