= Warrgamay language =

Australian Aboriginal language

Warrgamay
- Biyay
- Native to: Australia
- Region: Northeast Queensland
- Ethnicity: Warakamai, Biyaygiri
- Native speakers: (3 cited 1981)
- Language family: Pama–Nyungan: Dyirbalic; Warrgamay
- Dialects: Warrgamay; Biyay (Biyaygiri) 1; Biyay 2

Language codes
- ISO 639-3: wgy
- Glottolog: warr1255
- AIATSIS: Y134
- ELP: Warrgamay

Warrgamay is an extinct Australian Aboriginal language of northeast Queensland. It was closely related to Dyirbal.

It is also known as Waragamai, Wargamay, Wargamaygan, Biyay, and Warakamai. The language region includes the Herbert River area, Ingham, Hawkins Creek, Long Pocket, Herbert Vale, Niagara Vale, Yamanic Creek, Herbert Gorge, Cardwell, Hinchinbrook Island and the adjacent mainland.

== Phonology ==
=== Consonants ===
	Peripheral		Laminal	Apical	
	Labial	Velar	Palatal	Alveolar	Retroflex
Plosive	b	ɡ	ɟ	d	
Nasal	m	ŋ	ɲ	n	
Rhotic				r	
Lateral				l	
Approximant	w		j		ɻ

- Rhotic sounds /r/, /ɻ/ can also be heard as taps [ɾ], [ɽ].

=== Vowels ===
	Front	Central	Back
Close	i iː		u uː
Open		a aː	

== Sources ==
- Dixon, R. M. W. (1981). "Wargamay". In Dixon, R. M. W.; Blake, B. J. (eds.). Handbook of Australian languages. Vol. 2. Canberra: ANU Press. hdl:1885/114846. ISBN 0-7081-1212-9.
