= King Ranch (Tully River Station) =

Australian cattle ranch

King Ranch (Tully River Station) was a major cattle fattening ranch established in 1963 in the Wet Tropics of Queensland. It was developed by Bob Kleberg, a descendant of the King family of Texas, USA. Kleberg was offered a lease by the Queensland Government on 21,501 hectares (53,130 acres) of land, which at the time was largely covered in lowland tropical rainforest. It is sited on the traditional lands of the Dyirbal people. The land was made available to Kleberg by the government for A$5 per acre for forest and A$2 per acre for open field with the pre-development conditions that the land be cleared, seeded to pasture, and necessary infrastructure established within 5 years of the project's commencement. It was agreed that the land would be appraised by government experts within 5 years of completion of the work and if deemed to have been raised to optimum production levels King Ranch would buy the land as freehold at the price stipulated for its former undeveloped condition. All timber from the clearing operations were initially reserved for use and sale by the Queensland Government although it is doubtful whether this condition was fulfilled and it is likely that most of the cleared timber was burnt on location.

The arrangement between the Queensland Government and Kleberg initiated a major project to systematically clear the area of every tree and boulder upon the property with dynamite and bulldozers whilst filling in swamps to ensure that freehold conditions could be met within the 5-year period. After this livestock numbers increased from nil to almost 30,000 within around 10 years leading to King Ranch becoming the then-largest tropical cattle property in Australia. The Ranch's Australian operations were divided up and sold off for considerable capital gain in the late 1980s after the death of Kleberg with the area largely being converted to banana and cane farms.

Addendum : Bulldozers with chains between them, cleared thousands and thousands of hectares of virgin rainforest. The bulldozer drivers spoke of seeing small gunyah huts made from grass and leaves. The gunyahs were crushed under the weight of the chains. They claimed to have seen very short rainforest Aborigines running from the roaring machines that were bringing their world to an end. They fled deeper into the rainforest where some people claim they still exist.
