= Madjandji =

Indigenous Australian group

The Madjandji, also known as the Majañji, are indigenous Australian people in the area south of Cairns in the state of Queensland.

== Language ==
The Madjandji spoke Madjay, now classified as a dialect of Yidiny.

== Country ==
The Madjandji were rain-forest dwellers, inhabiting a small territory, estimated by Norman Tindale at some 150 square miles (390 km^{2}), in the area north of the mouth of the Russell River. Their inland extension to the west lay at Babinda. Their northern limits approached Deeral. Descendants of the Majandji still live in the region today.

== Alternative names ==
- Matjai (language name)
- Matjandji
- Madyay (?)
- Majay
- Mooka

== Sources ==
- "AIATSIS map of Indigenous Australia". AIATSIS. 28 July 2023.
- Dixon, R. M. W. (1991). Words of Our Country: Stories, Place Names and Vocabulary in Yidiny, the Aboriginal language of the Cairns-Yarrabah region (PDF). University of Queensland Press. ISBN 0-7022-2360-3.
- Dixon, R. M. W. (2015). Edible Gender, Mother-in-law Style, and Other Grammatical Wonders: Studies in Dyirbal, Yidiñ, and Warrgamay. Oxford University Press. ISBN 978-0-198-70290-0.
- Tindale, Norman Barnett (1974). "Madjandji (QLD)". Aboriginal Tribes of Australia: Their Terrain, Environmental Controls, Distribution, Limits, and Proper Names. Australian National University. ISBN 978-0-708-10741-6.
