= Djiru people =

Aboriginal Australian people of northern Queensland

The Djiru, otherwise spelt Jirru, Are an Aboriginal Australian people whose traditional lands are along the coasts of Northern Queensland, mainly the area around Mission Beach.

== Language ==
Djiru is a dialect of the Dyirbal language

== Country ==
The Djiru, a rain-forest people, occupy a large part of the coastal area now called Cassowary Coast. Norman Tindale estimate their lands as covering some 260 square kilometres (100 sq mi) around Clump Point and as far north as Murdering Point. Their southern extension runs to the mouth of the Tully River.

== Social organisation ==
Two names noted down in a list of Queensland tribes compiled by William Parry-Okeden arguably refer, not to distinct tribes, but to Djiru hordes:

- Boolboora
- Warryboora

== History ==
The first dispute with settlers occurred in 1872 when the survivors of the ship "Maria" that was shipwrecked near Johnstone River on the coast. Sub-Inspector Robert Johnstone led a search party to look for survivors and to punish the Mamu who had abused them. Commanding Native Police troopers, he systematically shot any Djiru encountered in his long beach trek and burnt their dwellings.

The Hull River Aboriginal Settlement, an Aboriginal reserve, was built on Djiru land at Mission Beach in 1914, with Aboriginal people brought from surrounding areas to live there for their "protection" or disciplinary reasons, under the Aboriginals Protection and Restriction of the Sale of Opium Act 1897. The settlement was destroyed by a huge cyclone in 1918, with surviving residents being transferred to the new reserve on Great Palm Island.

== Last members ==
The last speakers of the language were Joe Jamboree (Joe Tambourine?) and Pompey Clumppoint, the latter from Clump Point opposite Dunk Island. Pompey had been incarcerated on Palm Island for an incident of cannibalism in 1920. According to him the best-tasting human flesh was Chinese, followed by Aboriginal and, last, the otherwise tough and bitter flesh of Englishmen.

== Alternative names ==
- Djirubagala, Dyirubagala
- Dyiru
- Gerrah
- Gillah
- Iimba

Source: Tindale 1974, p. 167

== Sources ==
- Dixon, R. M. W. (1972). The Dyirbal Language of North Queensland. Cambridge University Press. p. 351. ISBN 978-0-521-08510-6.
- Dixon, R. M. W. (2011). Searching for Aboriginal Languages: Memoirs of a Field Worker. Cambridge University Press. ISBN 978-1-108-02504-1.
- Dixon, R. M. W.; Duwell, Martin (1990). The Honey-ant Men's Love Song and Other Aboriginal Song Poems. University of Queensland Press. ISBN 978-0-702-22278-8.
- "Indigenous History". Community for Coastal and Cassowary Conservation.
- Tindale, Norman Barnett (1974). "Djiru (QLD)". Aboriginal Tribes of Australia: Their Terrain, Environmental Controls, Distribution, Limits, and Proper Names. Australian National University Press.
- Turnbull, Paul (2017). Science, Museums and Collecting the Indigenous Dead in Colonial Australia. Springer. ISBN 978-3-319-51874-9.
