= Wulguru language =

Australian Aboriginal language

Wulguru
- Manbara
- Region: Townsville, Queensland
- Ethnicity: Manbarra (Wulgurukaba)
- Extinct: 1900?
- Language family: Pama–Nyungan: Dyirbalic; Nyawaygic; Wulguru

Language codes
- ISO 639-3: None (mis)
- Glottolog: wulg1239
- AIATSIS: Y135

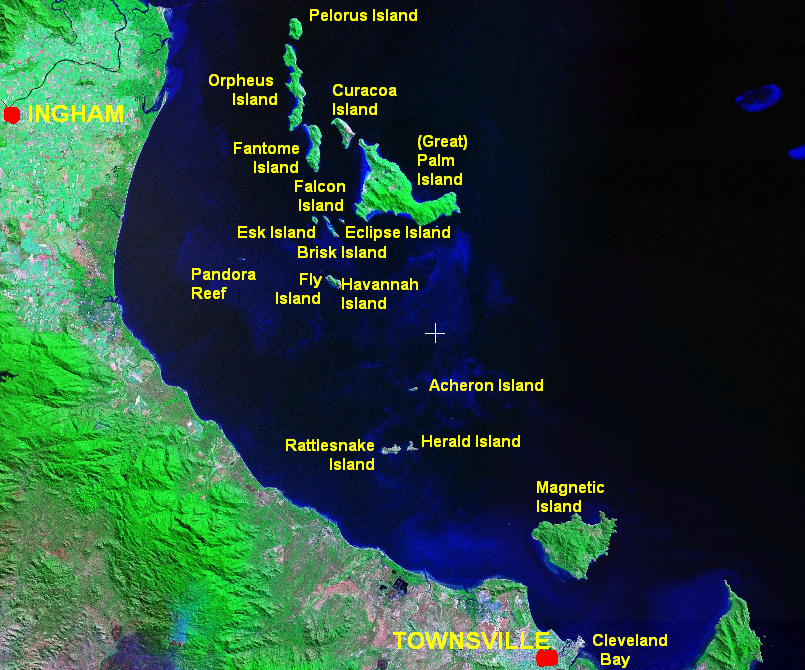
Palm Island and Townsville

Wulguru, (also known as Manbara, Manbarra, Korambelbara, Mun ba rah, Nyawaygi or Wulgurukaba) is an Australian Aboriginal language, now extinct, that was spoken by the Wulgurukaba (or Manbarra) people around the area around present day Townsville, Queensland, on the east coast of Australia. The range of Wulguru dialects known to have been around the area include two varieties mentioned from Palm Island, two from the Cleveland Bay area, and various dialects from Townsville.

== Classification ==
Wulguru seems to be a Pama–Nyungan language that was typical for the sort found on the eastern Australian coast. Wulguru ceased to be spoken before it was properly documented, and as a result much of what linguists know of the language is fragmentary.

Possible dialect names include Mulgu, Buluguyban, Wulgurukaba, Coonambella, Nhawalgaba.

== Phonology ==
Consonants of Wulguru
	Peripheral		Laminal		Apical
	Labial	Velar	Palatal	Dental	Alveolar
Stop	p	k	c	t̪	t
Nasal	m	ŋ	ɲ	n̪	n
Lateral					l
Trill					r
Approximant	w		j		ɹ

Wulguru has three vowels; /i/, /u/, and /a/. Length distinctions exist for all vowels.
