= Dyirbal language =

Australian Aboriginal language

Dyirbal
- Region: Northeast Queensland
- Ethnicity: Dyirbal, Ngajanji, Mamu, Gulngai, Djiru, Girramay
- Native speakers: 24 (2021 census)
- Language family: Pama–Nyungan: Eastern Pama–Nyungan?; Dyirbalic; Dyirbalic proper; Dyirbal
- Dialects: Jirrbal; Mamu; Girramay; Gulngay; Djirru; Ngadjan; Walmalbarra

Language codes
- ISO 639-3: dbl
- Glottolog: dyir1250
- AIATSIS: Y123
- ELP: Dyirbal
- Girramay
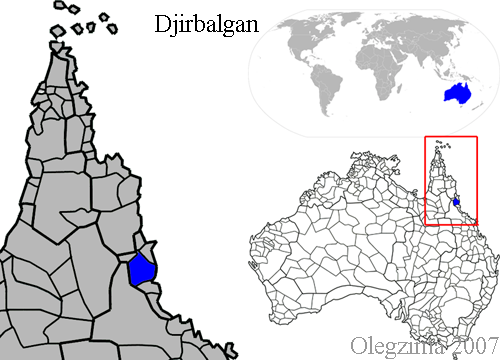
- Area of historical use

- Dyirbal is classified as Severely Endangered by the UNESCO Atlas of the World's Languages in Danger.

Dyirbal (/ˈdʒɜːrbəl/ JUR-bəl; also Djirubal) is an Australian Aboriginal language and dialect spoken in northeast Queensland traditionally spoken by the group of people known as the Dyirbal peoples (a term which also refers to one of the subgroups; the Dyirbal). Each subgroup had a dialect. According to the Australian Bureau of Statistics there were eight speakers of the language in 2016 and 24 speakers in 2021. It is a member of the small Dyirbalic branch of the Pama–Nyungan family. It possesses many outstanding features that have made it well known among linguists.

In the years since the Dyirbal grammar by Robert Dixon was published in 1972, Dyirbal has steadily moved closer to extinction as younger community members have failed to learn it.

== Dialects ==
There are many different groups speaking dialects of Dyirbal language. Researcher Robert Dixon estimates that Dyirbal had, at its peak, 10 dialects.

Dialects include:

- Dyirbal (or Jirrbal) spoken by the Dyirbalŋan
- Mamu, spoken by the Waɽibara, Dulgubara, Bagiɽgabara, Dyiɽibara, and Mandubara (There are also different types of Mamu spoken by individual groups, such as Warribara Mamu, and Dulgubara Mamu)
- Giramay (Or Girramay), spoken by the Giramaygan
- Gulŋay (or Gulngay), spoken by the Malanbara
- Dyiru (or Djirru), spoken by the Dyirubagala
- Ngadyan (or Ngadjan), spoken by the Ngadyiandyi
- Walmalbarra

The speakers of these dialects largely regard their dialects as different languages. They were classified as dialects by researcher Robert Dixon, who classified them as such based on linguistic criteria and their similarities, some dialects sharing as much as 90% of their vocabularies. Since the dialects were viewed by speakers as different languages, the language had no formal name, so Dixon assigned the language the name Dyirbal, naming it after Jirrbal, which was the dialect with the largest number of speakers at the time he was studying it.

== Neighbouring languages ==
Languages neighbouring the many Dyirbal dialects include:

- Ngaygungu
- Mbabaram
- Muluriji
- Yidiny
- Warungu
- Warrgamay
- Nyawaygi

== Phonology ==
=== Consonants ===
Dyirbal has only four places of articulation for the stop and nasals, whereas most other Australian Aboriginal languages have five or six. This is because Dyirbal lacks the dental/alveolar/retroflex split typically found in these languages. Like the majority of Australian languages, it does not make a distinction between voiced consonants (⟨b, d, g⟩, etc.) and voiceless consonants (the corresponding ⟨p, t, k⟩, etc.), respectively. Like Pinyin, standard Dyirbal orthography uses voiced consonants, which seem to be preferred by speakers of most Australian languages since the sounds (which can often be semi-voiced) are closer to English semi-voiced ⟨b, d, g⟩ than aspirated ⟨p, t, k⟩.

	Peripheral		Laminal	Apical	
	Bilabial	Velar	Palatal	Alveolar	Retroflex
Plosive	p	k	c	t	
Nasal	m	ŋ	ɲ	n	
Trill				r	
Approximant	w		j	l	ɻ

=== Vowels ===
The Dyirbal vowel system is typical of Australia, with three vowels: /i/, /a/ and /u/, though /u/ is realised as [o] in certain environments and /a/ can be realised as [e], also depending on the environment in which the phoneme appears. Thus the actual inventory of sounds is greater than the inventory of phonemes would suggest. Stress always falls on the first syllable of a word and usually on subsequent odd-numbered syllables except the ultima, which is always unstressed. The result of this is that consecutive stressed syllables do not occur.

== Grammar ==
The language is best known for its system of noun classes, numbering four in total. They tend to be divided among the following semantic lines:

- I – most animate objects, men
- II – women, water, fire, violence, and exceptional animals
- III – edible fruit and vegetables
- IV – miscellaneous (includes things not classifiable in the first three)

The class usually labelled "feminine" (II) inspired the title of George Lakoff's book Women, Fire, and Dangerous Things. Some linguists distinguish between such systems of classification and the gendered division of items into the categories of "feminine", "masculine" and (sometimes) "neuter" that is found in, for example, many Indo-European languages.

Dyirbal shows a split-ergative system. Sentences with a first or second person pronoun have their verb arguments marked for case in a pattern that mimics nominative–accusative languages. That is, the first or second person pronoun appears in the least marked case when it is the subject (regardless of the transitivity of the verb), and in the most marked case when it is the direct object. Thus Dyirbal is morphologically accusative in the first and second persons, but morphologically ergative elsewhere; and it is still always syntactically ergative.

== Taboo ==
=== Taboo relatives ===
There used to be in place a highly complex taboo system in Dyirbal culture. A speaker was completely forbidden from speaking with his/her mother-in-law, child-in-law, father's sister's child or mother's brother's child, and from approaching or looking directly at these people. Speakers were forbidden from speaking with their cross-cousins of the opposite sex due to the fact that those relatives were of the section from which an individual must marry, but were too close of kin to choose as a spouse so the avoidance might have been on the grounds of indicating anyone sexually unavailable.

Furthermore, because marriage typically took place a generation above or below, the cross-cousin of the opposite sex often is a potential mother-in-law or father-in-law. In addition, when within hearing range of taboo relatives a person was required to use a specialized and complex form of the language with essentially the same phonemes and grammar, but with a lexicon that shared no words with the standard language except for four lexical items referring to grandparents on the mother and father's side.

The taboo relationship was reciprocal. Thus, an individual was not allowed to speak with one's own mother-in-law and it was equally taboo for the mother-in-law to speak to her son-in-law. This relationship also prevailed among both genders such that a daughter-in-law was forbidden to speak to directly or approach her father-in-law and vice versa. This taboo existed, but less strongly enforced, between members of the same sex such that a male individual ought to have used the respectful style of speech in the presence of his father-in-law, but the father-in-law could decide whether or not to use the everyday style of speech or the respectful style in the presence of his son-in-law.

=== Dyalŋuy and Guwal ===
In the presence of taboo relatives, a specialized and complex form of the language was used. This form is called the Dyalŋuy, and contrasts with the everyday language, which is called Guwal in most dialects. A notable difference between the two is that the Dyalŋuy had one quarter of the amount of lexical items as the everyday language, which reduced the semantic content in actual communication in the presence of a taboo relative. For example, Guwal has multiple specialized verbs meaning 'to ask' (ŋanba-l), 'to invite someone over' (yumba-l), and 'to invite someone to accompany one' (bunma-l), while the Dyalŋuy only has one generic verb, baŋarrmba-l 'to ask'. There are no correspondences to the other three verbs of Guwal in Dyalŋuy.

To get around this limitation, Dyirbal speakers use many syntactic and semantic tricks to make do with a minimal vocabulary which reveals a lot to linguists about the semantic nature of Dyirbal. For example, Guwal makes use of lexical causatives, such as bana- 'break.TR' and gaynyja- 'break.NTR'. This is similar to English "He broke the glass" (transitive) vs. "The glass broke." (intransitive). Since Dyirbal has fewer lexemes, a morpheme -rri- is used as an intransitive derivational suffix. Thus the Dyalŋuy equivalents of the two words above were transitive yuwa and intransitive yuwa-rri-.

The lexical items found in Dyalŋuy were mainly derived from three sources:

* [B]orrowing from the everyday style of a neighbouring dialect or language [...]

- [C]reating [Dyalŋuy] forms by phonological deformation of lexemes in the language's own everyday style
- [B]orrowing terms that were already in the [Dyalŋuy] style of a neighboring language or dialect

— Robert M. W. Dixon, The Origin of "Mother-in-Law Vocabulary" in Two Australian Languages, p. 52

An example of borrowing between dialects is the word for sun in the Yidin and Ngadyan dialects. In Yidin, the Guwal style word for sun is [buŋan], and this same word was also the Dyalŋuy style of the word for sun in the Ngadyan dialect.

It is hypothesized that children of Dyirbal tribes were expected to acquire the Dyalŋuy speech style years following their acquisition of the everyday speech style from their cross cousins who would speak in Dyalŋuy in their presence. By the onset of puberty, the child probably spoke Dyalŋuy fluently and was able to use it in the appropriate contexts. This phenomenon, commonly called mother-in-law languages, was common in indigenous Australian languages. It existed until about 1930, when the taboo system fell out of use.

== Young Dyirbal ==
In the 1970s, speakers of Dyirbal and Giramay dialects purchased land in the Murray Upper, with the assistance of the Australian federal government and formed a community. Within this community shift in language began to occur, and with it came the emergence of new form of Dyirbal, dubbed by researcher Annette Schmidt "Young Dyirbal" or "YD". This language stands in contrast to "Traditional Dyirbal" or "TD".

Young Dyirbal is grammatically distinct from Traditional Dyirbal, in some cases being more similar to English, such as the gradual loss of ergative inflection, as is found in Traditional Dyirbal, in favour of a style of inflection more similar to the one found in English.
