= Gungganyji =

Aboriginal Australian people of northern Queensland

The Guŋgañji, also transcribed Gungganyji, Gunggandji, Kongkandji, and other variations, are an Aboriginal Australian people of the state of Queensland.

== Language ==
The Guŋgañji speak Gungay, a dialect of the Yidiny language.

== Country ==
Norman Tindale's estimate of Guŋgañji lands sets them at 390 square kilometres (150 sq mi). They are rainforest people, living around the Cape Grafton peninsula, west of the Prior Range, and their southern extension runs down to Palmer Point (Wararitji) and the mouth of Mulgrave River.

== Alternative names ==
- Kunggandji, Kunggandyi
- Kungganji, Kungandji, Koongangie
- Goonganji, Goonganjee
- Gunggay
- Kooganji
- Koo-gun-ji
- Gurugulu

== Sources ==
- "AIATSIS map of Indigenous Australia". AIATSIS. 14 May 2024.
- Dixon, R. M. W. (2011). Searching for Aboriginal Languages: Memoirs of a Field Worker. Cambridge University Press. ISBN 978-1-108-02504-1.
- Dixon, R. M. W. (2015). Edible Gender, Mother-in-law Style, and Other Grammatical Wonders: Studies in Dyirbal, Yidiñ, and Warrgamay. Oxford University Press. ISBN 978-0-198-70290-0.
- Tindale, Norman Barnett (1974). "Kongkandji (QLD)". Aboriginal Tribes of Australia: Their Terrain, Environmental Controls, Distribution, Limits, and Proper Names. Australian National University. ISBN 978-0-708-10741-6. Archived from the original on 3 February 2018.
