= Gulngay =

Aboriginal Australian people

The Gulngai were an indigenous Australian rainforest people of the state of Queensland. They are not to be confused with the Kuringgai.

== Language ==
Gulŋay was one of the Dyirbalic languages, and a dialect of Dyirbal.

== Country ==
Norman Tindale set their lands at some 200 square miles (520 km^{2}), situated around the Tully River below Tully Falls, and the Murray River. Their southern border lay on the range above Kirrama.

== Alternative names ==
- Kurungai
- Kulngai
- Gulngay
- Tjulngai
- Djulngai
- Mallanpara
- Malanbara
- Tully blacks

== Sources ==
- Ferrier, Åsa (2015). Journeys into the Rainforest: Archaeology of Culture Change and Continuity on the Evelyn Tableland, North Queensland. Australian National University Press. ISBN 978-1-925-02288-9.
- Tindale, Norman Barnett (1974). "Gulngai (QLD)". Aboriginal Tribes of Australia: Their Terrain, Environmental Controls, Distribution, Limits, and Proper Names. Australian National University Press.
