= Yidiny language =

Australian Aboriginal language

Yidiny
- Yidiɲ, Yidiñ, Jidinj, Jidinʲ, Yidinʸ, Yidiń
- Pronunciation: [ˈjidiɲ]
- Native to: Australia
- Region: Queensland
- Ethnicity: Yidinji, Gungganyji, Wanjuru, Madjandji
- Native speakers: 52 (2021 census)
- Language family: Pama–Nyungan: Yidiny
- Dialects: Yidinj; Gunggay; Wanjurr (Wanyurru); Madjay

Language codes
- ISO 639-3: yii
- Glottolog: yidi1250
- AIATSIS: Y117
- ELP: Yidiny
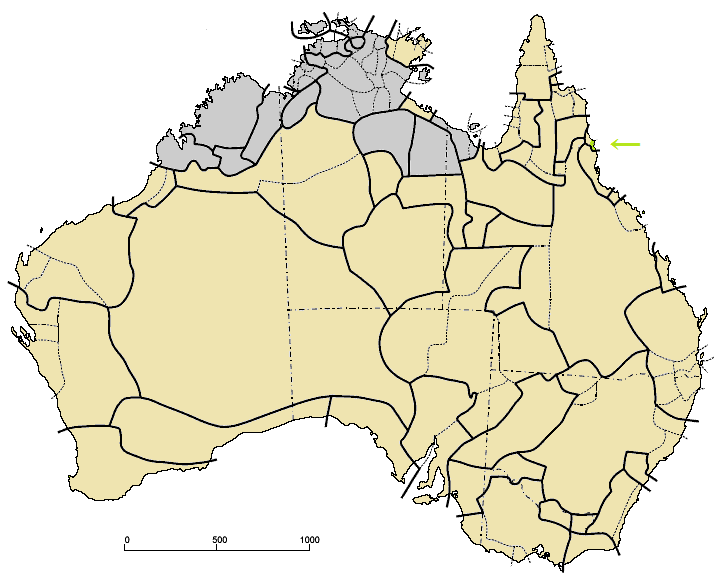
- Yidiny (green, with arrow) among other Pama–Nyungan languages (tan)

Yidiny (also spelled Yidiɲ, Yidiñ, Jidinj, Jidinʲ, Yidinʸ, Yidiń [ˈjidiɲ]) is a nearly extinct Australian Aboriginal language, spoken by the Yidinji people of north-east Queensland. Its traditional language region is within the local government areas of Cairns Region and Tablelands Region, in such localities as Cairns, Gordonvale, and the Mulgrave River, and the southern part of the Atherton Tableland including Atherton and Kairi.

== Classification ==
Yidiny forms a separate branch of Pama–Nyungan. It is sometimes grouped with Djabugay as Yidinyic, but Bowern (2011) retains Djabugay in its traditional place within the Paman languages.

== Phonology ==
=== Vowels ===
Yidiny has the typical Australian vowel system of /a, i, u/. Yidiny also displays contrastive vowel length.

	Front	Back
Close	i, iː	u, uː
Open	a, aː	

=== Consonants ===
	Peripheral		Laminal	Apical	
	Bilabial	Velar	Palatal	Alveolar	Retroflex
Plosive	b	g	ɟ	d	
Nasal	m	ŋ	ɲ	n	
Lateral				l	
Rhotic				r	
Approximant	w		j		ɻ

Yidiny consonants, with no underlyingly voiceless consonants, are posited by Dixon.

Dixon (1977) gives the two rhotics as a "trilled apical rhotic" and a "retroflex continuant".

== Grammar ==
The Yidiny language has a number of particles that change the meaning of an entire clause. These, unlike other forms in the language, such as nouns, verbs and gender markers, have no grammatical case and take no tense inflections. The particles in the Yidiny language: nguju - 'not' (nguju also functions as the negative interjection 'no'), giyi - 'don't', biri - 'done again', yurrga - 'still', mugu - 'couldn't help it' (mugu refers to something unsatisfactory but that is impossible to avoid doing), jaymbi / jaybar - 'in turn'. E.g. 'I hit him and he jaymbi hit me', 'He hit me and I jaybar hit him'. Dixon states that "pronouns inflect in a nominative-accusative paradigm… deictics with human reference have separate cases for transitive subject, transitive object, and intransitive subject… whereas nouns show an absolutive–ergative pattern." Thus three morphosyntactic alignments seem to occur: ergative–absolutive, nominative–accusative, and tripartite.

=== Pronouns and deictics ===
Pronoun and other pronoun-like words are classified as two separate lexical categories. This is for morphosyntactic reasons: pronouns show nominative-accusative case marking, while demonstratives, deictics, and other nominals show absolutive-ergative marking.

=== Affixes ===
In common with several other Australian Aboriginal languages, Yidiny is an agglutinative ergative-absolutive language. There are many affixes which indicate a number of different grammatical concepts, such as the agent of an action (shown by -nggu), the ablative case (shown by -mu or -m), the past tense (shown by -nyu) and the present and future tenses (both represented with the affix -ng).

There are also two affixes which lengthen the last vowel of the verbal root to which they are added, -Vli- and -Vlda (the capital letter 'V' indicates the lengthened final vowel of the verbal root). For example:

magi- + ili + -nyu = magiilinyu
{climb up} {} {do while going} {} PST {} {went up, climbing}

magi- + ilda + -nyu = magiildanyu
{climb up} {} {do while coming} {} PST {} {'came up, climbing'}

The affix -Vli- means 'do while going' and the affix -Vlda- means 'do while coming'. It is for this reason that they cannot be added to the verbs gali- 'go' or gada- 'come'.

One morpheme, -ŋa, is an applicative in some verbs and a causative in others. For example:

maŋga- + -ŋa = maŋga-ŋa-
laugh {} APPL {} {laugh at}

warrŋgi- + -ŋa = warrŋgi-ŋa-
{turn around} {} CAUS {} {turn something around}

The classes of verbs are not mutually exclusive however, so some words could have both meanings (bila- 'go in' becomes bila-ŋa- which translates either to applicative 'go in with' or causative 'put in'), which are disambiguated only through context.

=== Affixes and number of syllables ===
There is a general preference in Yidiny that as many words as possible should have an even number of syllables. It is for this reason that the affixes differ according to the word to which they are added. For example: the past tense affix is -nyu when the verbal root has three syllables, producing a word that has four syllables: majinda- 'walk up' becomes majindanyu in the past tense, whereas with a disyllabic root the final vowel is lengthened and -Vny is added: gali- 'go' becomes galiiny in the past tense, thus producing a word that has two syllables. The same principle applies when forming the genitive: waguja- + -ni = wagujani 'man's' (four syllables), bunya- + -Vn- = bunyaan 'woman's'.

The preference for an even number of syllables is retained in the affix that shows a relative clause: -nyunda is used with a verb that has two or four syllables (gali- (two syllables) 'go' + nyunda = galinyunda), giving a word that has four syllables whereas a word that has three or five syllables takes -nyuun (majinda- (three syllables) 'walk up' + nyuun = majindanyuun), giving a word that has four syllables.

== Vocabulary ==
- bunggu 'Knee', but more extensively: 'That part of the body of anything which, in moving, enables the rest of the body or object to be propelled.' This is used of the hump in a snake's back as it wriggles, the swish point of a crocodile's tail, or the wheel of a car or tractor.
- jilibura 'Green (tree) ant'. It was squeezed, and the 'milk' it yielded was then mixed with the ashes of a gawuul (blue gum tree), or from a murrgan (quandong) or a bagirram tree, and the concoction then drunk to clear headaches. The classifier used for ants, munyimunyi, was used for all species, such as the gajuu (black tree ant) and burrbal (red ant), but never for a jilibura because it was different, having a medicinal use.

== Bibliography ==
- Dixon, R. M. W. (1977). A Grammar of Yidiny. Cambridge University Press.
- Dixon, R. M. W. (1989) [1984]. Searching for Aboriginal Languages. University of Chicago Press.
- Dixon, R. M. W. (2011). Searching for Aboriginal Languages: Memoirs of a Field Worker. Cambridge University Press. ISBN 978-1-108-02504-1.
