= Dyirbalic languages =

Group of Australian Aboriginal languages

Dyirbalic
- Herbert River
- Geographic distribution: Queensland
- Linguistic classification: Pama–Nyungan: Dyirbalic
- Subdivisions: Dyirbalic proper; Nyawaygic; ?Yuru†

Language codes
- Glottolog: nyaw1248 (Nyawaygic) warr1255 (Warrgamay) dyir1250 (Dyirbal)
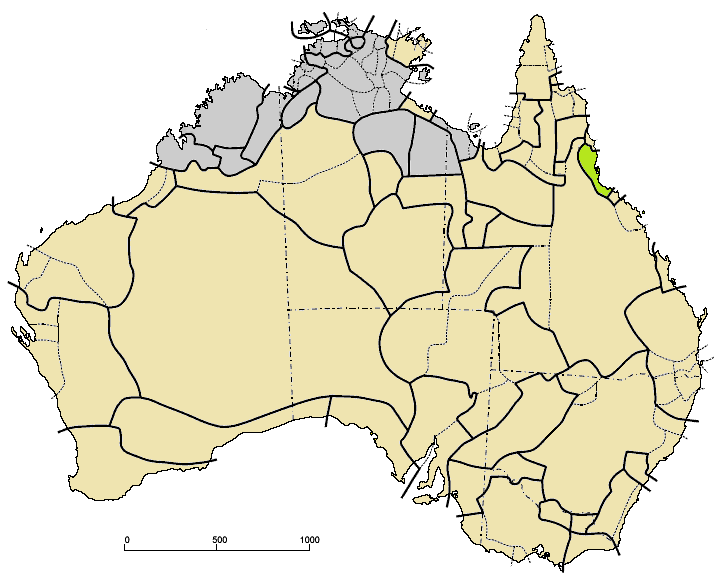
- Dyirbalic languages (green) among other Pama–Nyungan (tan)

The Dyirbalic languages are a group of languages forming a branch of the Pama–Nyungan family. They are:

- Dyirbalic
  - Dyirbalic proper
    - Dyirbal
    - Warrgamay
  - Nyawaygic
    - Wulguru
    - Nyawaygi

At least one of the Lower Burdekin languages, Yuru, may belong to the Nyawaygic branch.
