= Avoidance speech =

Sociolinguistic phenomena

Avoidance speech is a group of sociolinguistic phenomena in which a special restricted speech style must be used in the presence of or in reference to certain relatives, or in certain situations. Avoidance speech is found in many Australian Aboriginal and Austronesian languages as well as some North American languages, Highland East Cushitic languages and Southern Bantu languages. Chinese naming taboo prohibits speaking and writing syllables or characters that appear in the names of esteemed people, such as emperors, parents, and ancestors.

Avoidance speech styles tend to have the same phonology and grammar as the standard language they are a part of. The lexicon, however, tends to be smaller than in normal speech since the styles are only used for limited communication.

== Australia ==
=== Mother-in-law languages ===
Avoidance speech in Australian Aboriginal languages is closely tied to elaborate tribal kinship systems in which certain relatives are considered taboo. Avoidance relations differ from tribe to tribe in terms of strictness and to whom they apply. Typically, there is an avoidance relationship between a man and his mother-in-law, usually between a woman and her father-in-law, and sometimes between any person and their same-sex parent-in-law. For some tribes, avoidance relationships are extended to other family members, such as the mother-in-law's brother in Warlpiri or cross-cousins in Dyirbal. All relations are classificatory – more people may fall into the "mother-in-law" category than just a man's wife's mother.

Avoidance speech styles used with taboo relatives are often called mother-in-law languages, although they are not actually separate languages but separate vocabularies with the same grammar and phonology. Typically, the taboo vocabulary has a one-to-many correspondence with the everyday vocabulary. For example, in Dyirbal the avoidance style has one word, jijan, for all lizards, while the everyday style differentiates many varieties. In Guugu Yimidhirr the avoidance speech verb bali-l "travel" covers several everyday verbs meaning "go", "walk", "crawl", "paddle", "float, sail, drift", and "limp along". Corresponding avoidance and everyday words are generally not linguistically related. Avoidance forms tend to be longer than everyday forms.

In some areas, the avoidance style is used by both members of the avoidance relationship; in others the senior member may talk to the junior in everyday style. Behavior associated with avoidance speech is a continuum and varies between tribes. For the Dyirbal people, a man and his mother-in-law may not make eye contact, face one another or directly talk to each other. Rather, they must address a third person or even a nearby object. For slightly less restricted relationships, such as between a man and his father-in-law, avoidance style is used and must be spoken in a slow, soft voice. An extreme case of avoidance behavior is found in the Umpila, in which a man and his mother-in-law may not speak at all in each other's presence.

=== Secret languages ===
Children in these cultures acquire avoidance speech forms as part of their normal language development, learning with whom to use them at a fairly young age. Additionally, a few languages have another style, called a "secret language" or "mystic language", that is taught to boys as part of initiation rituals, and is only used between men.

== Africa ==
A special system of avoidance vocabulary is traditionally used by married women speaking Highland East Cushitic languages in southwestern Ethiopia. In Kambaata and Sidamo, this system is called ballishsha, and includes physical and linguistic avoidance of parents-in-law. Women who practice ballishsha do not pronounce any words beginning with the same syllable as the name of their husband's mother or father. Instead, they may use paraphrase, synonyms or semantically similar words, antonyms, or borrowings from other languages.

Ukuhlonipha is a traditional system of avoidance speech in Nguni Bantu languages of southern Africa including Zulu, Xhosa and Swazi, as well as Sotho. This special speech style and correlating respectful behaviors may be used in many contexts, but is most strongly associated with married women in respect to their father-in-law and other senior male relatives. Women who practice ukuhlonipha may not say the names of these men or any words with the same root as their names. They avoid the taboo words phonologically (substituting sounds) or lexically (replacing words with synonyms, etc.). The ukuhlonipha system also includes avoidance of the names of certain relatives by all speakers and physical avoidance of certain relatives.

== See also ==
- Crips#Language Written and spoken avoidance practices in American gangs
- Bear § Etymology (widely agreed to involve avoidance)
- Noa-name: A word used instead of a taboo or dangerous word
- Australian Aboriginal sign languages
- Minced oath
- Euphemism
- Honorifics (linguistics)
- Pandanus language
- Damin: Australian ritual language
- Pequeninos: fictional race from the post-Ender's Game trilogy; the ambulatory males and females avoid most direct communication, and use separate language styles otherwise.
- Taboo against naming the dead
