= Warrgamay =

Aboriginal Australian people of northern Queensland

The Warrgamay people, also spelt Warakamai, are an Aboriginal Australian people of the state of Queensland.

== Language ==
Their language, Warrgamay, is now extinct. It was a variety of Dyirbalic, and appears to be composed of three distinct dialects: Wargamaygan spoken around the lower reaches of the Herbert River; Biyay spoken at the mouth of the Herbert, in the area of Halifax and Bemerside; and Hinchinbrook Biyay, spoken around the coastal area south of Cardwell and offshore on Hinchinbrook Island.

Words in the Warrgamay language include:

- knarbo (tame dog)
- gerolo (wild dog)
- baby (father)
- kora/yong/yonga (mother)
- mecolo (white man)

== Country ==
The Warrgamay were the Indigenous people of Halifax Bay, and held in Norman Tindale's calculations, approximately 600 square miles (1,600 km^{2}) of tribal domains. An early resident, James Cassady, specified that they had 50 miles (80 km) of shoreline, extending into the hinterland approximately 15 miles (24 km).

Their northern neighbours were the Girramay, while to their south lay the Wulgurukaba.

== Social organisation ==
The Warrgamay were divided into several groups or clans:

- Ikelbara
- Doolebara
- Mungulbara
- Mandambara
- Karabara
- Bungabara
- Yoembara

The intermarriage of groups has been classified as follows:

| Male | Female | Male Children | Female Children |
|---|---|---|---|
| Korkoro | Wongarugun | Watero | Woterungan |
| Wongo | Korkorungan | Korkeen | Korkeelingan |
| Korkeen | Woterungan | Wongo | Wongerungan |
| Wotero | Korkeelingan | Korkoro | Korkorungan |

== Customs ==
Circumcision as an initiatory rite was unknown among the Warrgamay. They did practise tooth avulsion, ritual scarification and piercing of the septum to wear nose bones. Polygamy was common, and widows were married to their deceased husband's brother.

== History of contact ==
The area of Halifax Bay first began to be settled by white colonialists in 1865, in the then Colony of Queensland. At that time the numbers of Warrgamay were estimated to amount to roughly 500 people. Within 15 years, they had declined by 300, a mere 40 of the surviving 200 being men. The difference was due to their being relentlessly hunted and gunned down by mounted native troopers under white supervision, together with settlers, both of whom "shot as many of the males of the tribe as possible". (Note: According to another resident, R. Johnstone, the reasons for the decline had nothing to do with the police or settlers: 'Their country was occupied by the whites to some extent, since which period, as the result of measles, consumption, and drink, the numbers composing the tribes have greatly diminished.')

== Alternative names ==
Alternative names and spellings included, according to Tindale:

- Waragamai
- Wargamay
- Wargamaygan
- Bungabara
- Ikelbara
- Herbert River tribe

== Sources ==
- Cassidy, James; Johnstone, R. (1886). "Halifax Bay" (PDF). In Curr, Edward Micklethwaite (ed.). The Australian race: its origin, languages, customs, place of landing in Australia and the routes by which it spread itself over the continent. Vol. 2. Melbourne: J. Ferres. pp. 424–431.
- Dixon, Robert M. W. (1966). "Mbabaram: a dying Australian language". Bulletin of the School of Oriental and African Studies. 29: 97–121. doi:10.1017/S0041977X00060833. S2CID 162853579.
- Dixon, Robert M. W. (1981). "Wartgamay" (PDF). In Dixon, Robert M. W.; Blake, Barry (eds.). Handbook of Australian languages. Vol. 2. Australian National University. pp. 1–145. ISBN 978-9-027-22004-2.
- Fison, Lorimer; Howitt, Alfred William (1880). Kamilaroi and Kurnai (PDF). Melbourne: G Robinson.
- Tindale, Norman Barnett (1974). "Warakamai (QLD)". Aboriginal Tribes of Australia: Their Terrain, Environmental Controls, Distribution, Limits, and Proper Names. Australian National University Press.
