= Girramay =

Australian Aboriginal tribe

The Girramay are an Australian Aboriginal tribe of northern Queensland.

== Name ==
The Girramay ethnonym is formed from jir:a, meaning "man".

== Language ==
The Girramay spoke the most southerly dialect of Dyirbal.

== Country ==
The Girramay people's traditional lands extend over some 1,000 square miles (2,600 km^{2}) south from Rockingham Bay to Cardwell. Northwards, their boundaries reach close to the upper Murray River and the Cardwell Range, and also take in inland areas of the Herbert River.

== Society ==
Before European settlement, the Girramay lived in a mixture of rainforest and open forest environments.

== Foods and artefacts ==
Girramay territory has trees with a variety of bark that could be beaten into a cloth to fashion a "rain shield" and neighbouring tribes such as the Dyirbal and Ngajanji therefore called this device a keramai, their pronunciation of the Girramay ethnonym. (Note: "Among the rain forest Negrito tribes of the Atherton tableland, trade was local with the people on the coast and north and south along it. There are collective terms used for the trade goods that seem to be linked with the tribal source from which they originate. Thus I learned that the Ngajanji and Djirubal (fig. 27) used a rain shield called keramai made by beating the bark of a tree, a crude form of tapa cloth. These bark rain shields were traded from the south. The trees from which the bark coverings were made grow in the country of the Keramai tribe along the Herbert River, hence their name. Similarly pearl shell pendants, Nautilus shell necklaces, and Melo shells came from the Bandjin of the Hinchinbrook Island area, hence were collectively bandjin. Roth (1910) was the first to record this without noticing the connection with tribal names. He found that trade goods received by the Gulngai (his Mallanpara) of the Tully Falls area, coming from the north, were termed irakanji while those from the south were kun-yin. The first term is very obviously the same as the name of the Irukandji of the Cairns lowlands and the second is perhaps a mistake in recording or a mishearing of the term bandjin given above.")

- wila (cakes of brown walnut)

== Alternative names ==
- Kiramai
- Giramai, Giramay, Giramaygan
- Kirrama, Kirrami, Kerrami
- Wombelbara (Warakamai exonym)

== Some words ==
- gamu (water) cf. Dyirbal bana
- gumbul (woman) cf. Dyirbal jugumbil
- garba (ear) cf. Dyirbal manga
- wuyan, a verb meaning to "keep on taking bit by bit from a group, or from a pile of objects, until scarcely any remain"
- whoyerr (tame dog)

== Sources ==
- Dixon, R. M. W. (2011). Searching for Aboriginal Languages: Memoirs of a Field Worker. Cambridge University Press. ISBN 978-1-108-02504-1.
- Dixon, R. M. W. (2012). Basic Linguistic Theory Volume 3: Further Grammatical Topics. Oxford University Press. ISBN 978-0-199-57109-3.
- Douglas, A. D. (1900). "Kirrami tribe, Cardwell, Queensland". Science of Man. 3 (1): 8–9.
- Stephen, William S. (1886). "Herbert River" (PDF). In Curr, Edward Micklethwaite (ed.). The Australian race: its origin, languages, customs, place of landing in Australia and the routes by which it spread itself over the continent. Vol. 2. Melbourne: J. Ferres. pp. 422–423.
- Tindale, Norman Barnett (1974). "Keramai (QLD)". Aboriginal Tribes of Australia: Their Terrain, Environmental Controls, Distribution, Limits, and Proper Names. Australian National University Press. ISBN 978-0-708-10741-6.
