= Robert M. W. Dixon =

English-born Australian linguist (born 1939)

- Born: Robert Malcolm Ward Dixon; 25 January 1939 (age 87); Gloucester, England
- Occupation: Linguist
- Spouse: Alexandra Aikhenvald

Academic work
- Discipline: Linguist
- Sub-discipline: Linguistic typology; Australian Aboriginal languages; Fijian
- Institutions: La Trobe University; Australian National University; James Cook University
- Main interests: Australian Aboriginal languages

Robert Malcolm Ward Dixon (born 25 January 1939, in Gloucester, England) is a British linguist and the Professor of Linguistics in the College of Arts, Society, and Education and The Cairns Institute, James Cook University, Queensland. He is also Deputy Director of The Language and Culture Research Centre at JCU. Doctor of Letters (DLitt, ANU, 1991), he was awarded an Honorary Doctor of Letters Honoris Causa by JCU in 2018. Fellow of British Academy; Fellow of the Australian Academy of the Humanities, and Honorary member of the Linguistic Society of America, he is one of three living linguists to be specifically mentioned in The Concise Oxford Dictionary of Linguistics by Peter Matthews (2014).

== Early life ==
Dixon was born in Gloucester, in the west of England, in 1939 and as a child lived at Stroud and later at Bramcote near Nottingham, where his father became principal of the People's College of Further Education. He was educated at Nottingham High School and then at the University of Oxford, where he took his first degree in mathematics in 1960, and finally at the University of Edinburgh, where he was a Research Fellow in Statistical Linguistics in the English department from July 1961 to September 1963. After that until September 1964 he did field work for the Australian Institute of Aboriginal Studies in north-east Queensland, working on several of the Aboriginal languages of Australia, but taking a particular interest in Dyirbal.

== Career ==
=== Research ===
Dixon has written on many areas of linguistic theory and fieldwork, being particularly noted for his work on the languages of Australia and the Arawan languages of Brazil. He has published grammars of Dyirbal, Yidiɲ, Warrgamay, Nyawaygi, and Mbabaram. He published a comprehensive grammar of Boumaa Fijian, a Polynesian language (1988), and Jarawara, an Arawá language from southern Amazonia (2004), for which he received the Leonard Bloomfield Book Award from the Linguistic Society of America.

Dixon's work in historical linguistics has been highly influential. Based on a careful historical comparative analysis, Dixon questions the concept of Pama–Nyungan languages, for which he argues sufficient evidence has never been provided. He also proposes a new "punctuated equilibrium" model, based on the theory of the same name in evolutionary biology, which is more appropriate for numerous language regions, including the Australian languages. Dixon puts forth his theory in The Rise and Fall of Languages, refined in his monograph Australian Languages: their nature and development (2002). Dixon is the author of a number of other books, including Australian Languages: Their Nature and Development and Ergativity. His monumental three-volume work Basic Linguistic Theory (2010–2012) was published by the Oxford University Press.

His further work on Australian languages was published in Edible gender, mother-in-law style, and other grammatical wonders: Studies in Dyirbal, Yidiñ and Warrgamay, 2015.

His further influential monographs include work on English grammar, especially A new approach to English grammar (1991, revised edition 2005), and Making New Words: Morphological Derivation in English (2014). His recent monograph Are Some Languages Better than Others (2016, paperback 2018) poses a question of efficiency and value of different languages.

His editorial work includes four volumes of Handbook of Australian Languages (with Barry Blake), a special issue of Lingua on ergativity, and, jointly with Alexandra Aikhenvald, numerous volumes on linguistic typology in the series Explorations in Linguistic Typology, the fundamental The Amazonian languages (1999), and The Cambridge Handbook of Linguistic Typology (2017).

His most recent book is The Unmasking of English Dictionaries (2018), which offers a concise history of English dictionaries unmasking their drawbacks, and suggests a new innovative way of dictionary making. (Note: Cambridge University Press's page describing The Unmasking of English Dictionaries is here.)

His "We used to eat people", Revelations of a Fiji islands traditional village (2018) offers a vivid portrayal of his fieldwork in Fiji in the late 1980s. (Note: McFarland's page describing "We used to eat people" is here.)

=== Academic positions ===
In 1996, Dixon and another linguist, Alexandra Aikhenvald, established the Research Centre for Linguistic Typology at the Australian National University in Canberra. On 1 January 2000, the centre moved to La Trobe University in Melbourne.

Both Dixon (the director of the centre) and Aikhenvald (its associate director) resigned their positions in May 2008. In early 2009, Aikhenvald and Dixon established the Language and Culture Research Group (LCRG) at the Cairns campus of James Cook University. This has been transformed into a Language and Culture Research Centre within the Faculty of Arts and Social Sciences at JCU, Cairns, in 2011. Currently, Aikhenvald is director and Dixon deputy director of the centre.

== Bibliography ==
(The list below is incomplete. (Note: For a more complete list, see "Publications by: R.M.W. Dixon" at JCU.))

=== As author or coauthor ===
- Linguistic Science and Logic. Janua linguarum. Studia memoriae Nicolai Van Wijk dedicata, series minor, 28. The Hague: Mouton, 1963. OCLC 422650387
- Blues and Gospel Records, 1902–1943. With William John Godrich.
  - 1st ed. Harrow: Steve Lane, 1964. OCLC 558932546.
  - 2nd ed. London: Storyville, 1969. OCLC 776817465.
  - 3rd ed. Essex: Storyville Publications, 1982. OCLC 562734610. (Note: At least two compact lists of addenda were issued: Corrections and additions to Blues and gospel records, 1902–1943, 3rd edition. With John Godrich. Montreal: Canadian Collectors' Congress, 1984. OCLC 35978680. Further corrections/additions, Blues and gospel records (1902–1943), 3rd edition. With Roger Misiewicz. Montreal: Canadian Collectors' Congress, 1985. OCLC 35978688.)
- Blues and Gospel Records: 1890–1943. With John Godrich and Howard Rye.
  - 4th ed. Oxford: Oxford University Press, 1997. ISBN 0198162391.
- What Is Language? A New Approach to Linguistic Description. London: Longmans, Green, 1966. OCLC 848262046.
- How to Understand Aliens. In: Worlds of Tomorrow, January 1966, pp. 115–122.
- Alien Arithmetic. In: Worlds of Tomorrow, May 1966, pp. 113–119.
- Recording the Blues. With John Godrich. New York: Stein and Day, 1970. ISBN 0812813189, ISBN 0812813227. London: Studio Vista, 1970. ISBN 0289798302, ISBN 0289798299.
- The Dyirbal Language of North Queensland. Cambridge Studies in Linguistics 9. Cambridge: Cambridge University Press, 1972. ISBN 0521085101, ISBN 0521097487. doi:10.1017/CBO9781139084987. Online ISBN 9781139084987.
- Grammatical categories in Australian languages. Canberra: Australian Institute of Aboriginal Studies; [Atlantic Highlands, NJ]: Humanities Press, 1976. ISBN 0855750553, ISBN 0391006940, ISBN 0391006959.
- A Grammar of Yidiɲ. Cambridge Studies in Linguistics 19. Cambridge: Cambridge University Press, 1977. ISBN 1139085042, ISBN 0521214629. Reprinted 2010. ISBN 0521142423. doi:10.1017/CBO9781139085045. Online ISBN 9781139085045.
- The Languages of Australia. Cambridge Language Surveys. Cambridge: Cambridge University Press, 1980. ISBN 0521223296, ISBN 0521294509. Cambridge Library Collection. Cambridge: Cambridge University Press, 2011. doi:10.1017/CBO9780511719714. ISBN 9781108017855. Online ISBN 9780511719714.
- Where Have All the Adjectives Gone? and Other Essays in Semantics and Syntax. Janua Linguarum, Series maior, 107. Berlin: Mouton, 1982. ISBN 902793309X.
- Studies in Ergativity. Amsterdam: North-Holland, 1987. ISBN 044470275X.
- A Grammar of Boumaa Fijian. Chicago: University of Chicago Press, 1988. ISBN 0226154289, ISBN 0226154297.
- Australian Aboriginal Words in English: Their Origin and Meaning.
  - With W. S. Ramson and Mandy Thomas. Oxford: Oxford University Press, 1991. ISBN 0195530993. 1992. ISBN 0195533941.
  - 2nd ed. With Bruce Moore, W. S. Ramson and Mandy Thomas. Oxford: Oxford University Press, 2007. ISBN 0195540735.
- A New Approach to English Grammar, on Semantic Principles. Oxford: Clarendon Press, 1991. Hardback 0198242727, paperback ISBN 0198240570.
  - A Semantic Approach to English Grammar. Oxford Textbooks in Linguistics. New York: Oxford University Press, 2005. Revised edition. Hardback ISBN 0199283079, paperback ISBN 0199247404.
  - 英语语义语法 = A Semantic Approach to English Grammar. Beijing, 2016. ISBN 9787519205652. The English text, with a short additional text in Chinese.
- Searching for Aboriginal Languages: Memoirs of a Field Worker. St Lucia: University of Queensland Press, 1984. Hardback ISBN 0702219339, paperback ISBN 0702217131}. Chicago: University of Chicago Press, 1989. ISBN 0226154300. Cambridge Library Collection. Cambridge: Cambridge University Press, 2011. doi:10.1017/CBO9780511791994. Paperback ISBN 9781108025041, online ISBN 9780511791994. A memoir of Dixon's early fieldwork in Australia. The book provides a glimpse at linguistic fieldwork as it was done in that era, as well as a look at the appalling treatment of Aboriginal peoples of Australia that continued right into the 1960s.
- Ergativity. Cambridge Studies in Linguistics 69. Cambridge: Cambridge University Press, 1994. doi:10.1017/CBO9780511611896. Hardback ISBN 0521444462, paperback ISBN 0521448980. Online ISBN 9780511611896.
- Dyirbal Song Poetry: The Oral Literature of an Australian Rainforest People. With Grace Koch. St Lucia: University of Queensland Press, 1996. ISBN 0702225932. Accompanied by a CD, OCLC 222004131.
- The Rise and Fall of Languages. Cambridge: Cambridge University Press, 1997. Hardback ISBN 0521623103, paperback ISBN 0521626544. Cambridge: Cambridge University Press, 2006. ISBN 9780521626545. doi:10.1017/CBO9780511612060. Online ISBN 9780511612060.
  - 言語の興亡. Iwanami Shinsho. Tokyo: Iwanami Shoten, 2001. ISBN 978-4-00-430737-2 Japanese translation.
  - 語言的興衰. Taipei, 2014. ISBN 9789860402292. Chinese translation.
- Changing Valency: Case Studies in Transitivity. With A. Y. Aikhenvald. Cambridge: Cambridge University Press, 2000. doi:10.1017/CBO9780511627750. Hardback ISBN 978-0-521-66039-6, paperback ISBN 978-0-521-13520-7, online ISBN 9780511627750.
- The Jarawara language of Southern Amazonia. Oxford: Oxford University Press, 2004. Hardback ISBN 9780199270675, paperback ISBN 9780199600694.
- Australian Languages: Their Nature and Development. Cambridge Language Surveys. Cambridge: Cambridge University Press, 2002. doi:10.1017/CBO9780511486869. Hardback ISBN 9780521473781, paperback ISBN 9780521046046, online ISBN 9780511486869.
- Basic Linguistic Theory. Oxford: Oxford University Press.
  - Vol 1, Methodology. 2009. Hardback ISBN 9780199571055, paperback ISBN 9780199571062.
  - Vol 2, Grammatical Topics. 2009. Hardback ISBN 9780199571079, paperback ISBN 9780199571086.
  - Vol 3, Further Grammatical Topics. 2012. Hardback ISBN 9780199571093, paperback ISBN 9780199571109.
- I Am a Linguist. Leiden: Brill, 2011. Hardback ISBN 9789004192355, paperback ISBN 9789004194052. An autobiography.
- Language at Large: Essays on Syntax and Semantics. With A. Y. Aikhenvald. Empirical Approaches to Linguistic Theory 2. Leiden: Brill, 2011. ISBN 9789004206076. 2018. ISBN 9789004392816.
- Making New Words: Morphological Derivation in English. Oxford: Oxford University Press, 2014. Hardback ISBN 9780198712367, paperback ISBN 9780198712374.
- Edible Gender, Mother-in-Law Style, and Other Grammatical Wonders: Studies in Dyirbal, Yidiñ and Warrgamay. Oxford: Oxford University Press, 2015. ISBN 9780198702900.
- Are Some Languages Better than Others? Oxford: Oxford University Press, 2016. Hardback ISBN 9780198766810, paperback ISBN 9780198817833.
- "We used to eat people": Revelations of a Fiji Islands Traditional Village. Jefferson, NC: McFarland, 2017. ISBN 9781476671819.
- The Unmasking of English Dictionaries. Cambridge: Cambridge University Press, 2018. doi:10.1017/9781108377508. Online ISBN 9781108377508.
- Australia's Original Languages: An Introduction. Crows Nest, NSW: Allen & Unwin, 2019. ISBN 9781760875237.

=== As editor or coeditor ===
- Grammatical categories of Australian languages. Canberra: Australian Institute of Aboriginal Languages (Editor), 1976.
- R. M. W. Dixon and Barry J. Blake, eds. Handbook of Australian Languages.
  - Vol 1. (Guugu Yimidhirr. Pitta-Pitta. Gumbaynggir. Yaygir.) Canberra: Australian National University Press, 1979. ISBN 0708112013. Amsterdam: John Benjamins, 1979. ISBN 90-272-0512-4.
  - Vol 2. (Wargamay, The Mpakwithi dialect of Anguthimri; Watjarri. Margany and Gunya, Tasmanian.) Canberra: Australian National University Press, 1981. ISBN 0708112129. Amsterdam: John Benjamins, 1981. ISBN 9027220042.
  - Vol 3. (Djapu, a Yolngu dialect. Yukulta. Uradhi. Nyawaygi.) Canberra: Australian National University Press, 1983. ISBN 0708112153. Amsterdam: John Benjamins, 1983 ISBN 9027220026.
  - Vol 4, The aboriginal language of Melbourne and other grammatical sketches. South Melbourne: Oxford University Press, 1991. ISBN 0195530977.
  - Vol 5, Grammatical sketches of Bunuba, Ndjébbana and Kugu Nganhcara. South Melbourne: Oxford University Press, 2000. ISBN 0195549988.
- The Honey-Ant Men's Love Song and Other Aboriginal Song Poems (UQP Poetry), 1990
- Words of our country: Stories, place names, and vocabulary in Yidiny, the Aboriginal Language of the Cairns-Yarrabah Region (Editor), 1991.
- The Amazonian Languages (Editor with A. Y. Aikhenvald), 1999
- Areal Diffusion and Genetic Inheritance: Problems in Comparative Linguistics (Editor with A. Y. Aikhenvald), 2002
- Word: A Cross-linguistic Typology. Editor with A. Y. Aikhenvald. Cambridge: Cambridge University Press, 2003. doi:10.1017/CBO9780511486241. Online ISBN 9780511486241.
- Adjective Classes: A Cross-Linguistic Typology (Editor with A. Y. Aikhenvald), 2006
- Complementation: A Cross-Linguistic Typology (Editor with A. Y. Aikhenvald), 2006
- Serial Verb Constructions: A Cross-Linguistic Typology (Editor with A. Y. Aikhenvald), 2007. Here at Google Books.
- Grammars in Contact: A Cross-Linguistic Typology (Editor with A. Y. Aikhenvald), 2007
- The Semantics of Clause Linking: A Cross-Linguistic Typology (Editor with A. Y. Aikhenvald), 2009. Here at Google Books.
- Possession and Ownership (Editor with A. Y. Aikhenvald), 2013
- The Grammar of Knowledge: A Cross-Linguistic Typology (Editor with A. Y. Aikhenvald), 2014
- The Cambridge Handbook of Linguistic Typology. Editor with A. Y. Aikhenvald. Cambridge: Cambridge University Press, 2017. doi:10.1017/9781316135716. Online ISBN 9781316135716.
- Commands: A Cross-Linguistic Typology (Editor with A. Y. Aikhenvald), 2017
- Non-Canonical Marking of Subjects and Objects. Editor with A. Y. Aikhenvald and Masayuki Onishi.

=== Pseudonymous publications ===
During the 1960s, Dixon published two science-fiction short stories under the name of Simon Tully, and in the 1980s two detective novels under the name of Hosanna Brown.
