= Poignant (surname) =

Poignant is a surname. Notable people with the surname include:

- Axel Poignant (1906–1986), Australian photographer
- Bernard Poignant (born 1945), French politician, Member of the European Parliament
- Jan Poignant (born 1941), Swedish sports shooter
- Roslyn Poignant (1927–2019), Australian photographic anthropologist
- Serge Poignant (born 1947), French politician, member of the National Assembly
