= Great Palm Island =

Island off the North-Eastern Australian coast

(Great) Palm Island
Bwgcolman
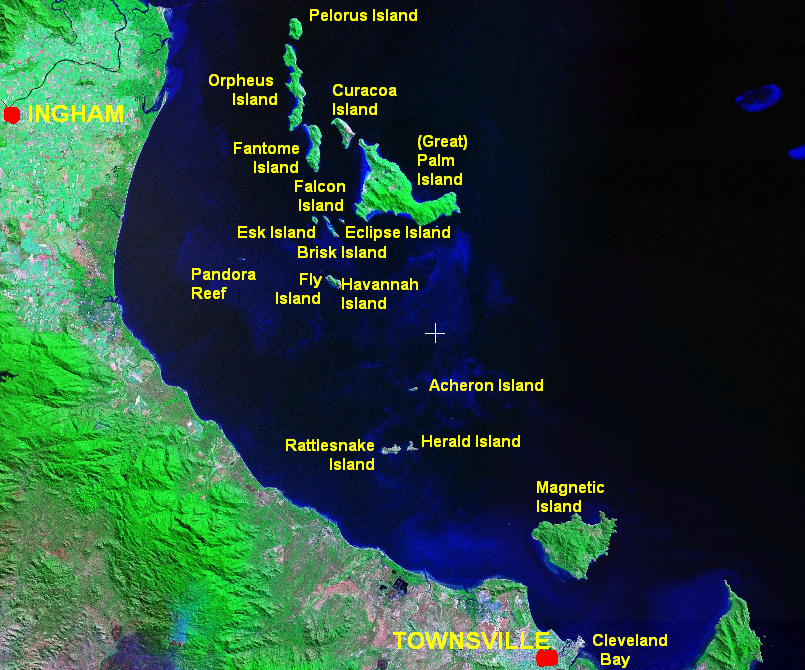
- Palm Islands
- Interactive map of (Great) Palm Island

Geography
- Coordinates: 18.73633°S 146.617699°E
- Archipelago: Palm Islands, Queensland
- Area: 55 km^{2} (21 sq mi)
- Highest elevation: 548 m (1798 ft)

Administration
- Australia
- State: Queensland

Great Palm Island, usually known as Palm Island, is the largest island in the Palm Islands group off Northern Queensland, Australia. It is known for its Aboriginal community, the legacy of an Aboriginal reserve, the Palm Island Aboriginal Settlement (also known as "the Mission"). The original inhabitants of the island (and others in the group) were the Manbarra people, also known as the Wulgurukaba, who were removed to the mainland by the Queensland Government in the 1890s. The island is also sometimes referred to as Bwgcolman, which is the name given to the Aboriginal and Torres Strait Islander people from disparate groups who were deported from many areas of Queensland to the reserve in 1918, and their descendants.

The island has an area of 55 km^{2} (21 sq mi). The official area figure of 70.9 square kilometres (27.4 sq mi) refers to Aboriginal Shire of Palm Island, which includes nine smaller islands. It is off the east coast of Northern Queensland, situated 65 kilometres (40 mi) northwest of Townsville, and 800 kilometres (500 mi) north of the Tropic of Capricorn. It consists of small bays, sandy beaches and steep forested mountains rising to a peak of 548 metres (1,798 ft). The ocean surrounding the island is part of the Great Barrier Reef Marine Park, where extraction and fishing are regulated.

Along with nine of the other smaller islands within the Palm Islands group, it falls under the local government area of the Aboriginal Shire of Palm Island. It is the only inhabited island within the Shire.

== Naming ==
It is not known what the Manbarra people called the island before colonisation. The island group was named the "Palm Isles" by explorer James Cook in 1770 as he sailed up the eastern coast of Australia on his first voyage. The name "Great Palm Island" for this island goes back at least as far as 1866.

Other names include or have included the Mission, Palm Island settlement, Palm Island Aborigines settlement, Palm Island Community, and Bwgcolman.

== History ==
Great Palm Island is often termed a classic "tropical paradise" given its natural endowments, but it has had a troubled history since the European settlement of Australia.

=== Pre-contact ===
In Manbarra beliefs the Palm Island group were formed in the Dreamtime from the broken up fragments of an ancestral spirit, Rainbow Serpent.

Manbarra (also known as Wulgurukaba) is a language of the Palm Island region, which lies within the local government boundaries of the Palm Island Aboriginal Shire Council.

=== 18th century ===
The islands in the area were named the "Palm Isles" by explorer James Cook in 1770 as he sailed up the eastern coast of Australia on his first voyage. It is estimated that the population of the island at the time of Cook's visit was about 200 Manbarra people. Cook sent some of his men to Palm Island and "they returned on board having met with nothing worth observing".

=== 19th century ===
In 1819, Captain Phillip Parker King landed on one of the islands and recorded seeing recently occupied circular huts, and canoes nearby their landing place.

From the 1850s, locals were recruitment targets to leave the island to be involved with bêche-de-mer and pearling enterprises with Europeans and Japanese.

Calls for Palm Island to be proclaimed as a reserve were made in 1889 when the Secretary of the Townsville Aboriginal Protection Association wrote to the Colonial Secretary asking for a reserve to be established on the Island, but no action was taken.

By the end of the 19th century the population had been reduced to about 50.

==== Kukamunburra ====
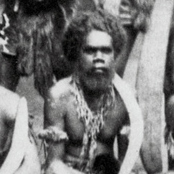
This is believed to be Kukamunburraa

A burial site and headstone is located in the "Mission" area of Palm Island. It tells the story of a young Palm Island man of the 19th century called Kukamunburra who was renamed "Tambo" by a circus agent for the "Barnum, Bailey and Hutchinson's Greatest show on earth". After being kidnapped by United States circus agent Robert A. Cunningham in 1883, he was toured along with eight other Murris, three of whom were from Hinchinbrook Island and five from Palm.

In 1884, Kukamunburra died at 21 years old of pneumonia in Cleveland, United States. The rest of the circus group carried on to the European leg of the tour; by the end of 1885 only three of the Murris were still alive. Kukamunburra's partner, Sussy Dakaro died 1885 in Wuppertal, Germany, aged about 17 years.

Kukamunburra's body was embalmed; 109 years later, in 1993, the body was discovered in a local funeral parlour. Anthropologist Roslyn Poignant was able to identify the body and his remains were returned to his homeland and buried on Palm Island in February 1994.

=== 20th century ===
For much of the twentieth century it was used by the Queensland Government as a settlement for Aboriginal people considered guilty of such infractions as being "disruptive", being pregnant to a white man or being born with mixed blood ("half-caste"), a type of Aboriginal reserve that was also a penal settlement. Beginning in 1918, the island was used by the Queensland Government as a settlement for Aboriginal people from many different areas of Queensland.

==== 1918–1975: Palm Island Aboriginal Settlement ====
In 1909 the Chief Protector of Aborigines visited the island, apparently to check on the activities of Japanese pearling crews in the area, and reported the existence of a small camp of Aboriginal people. In 1916 he found that Palm "suitable for use as a penitentiary" for "individuals we desire to punish".

On 10 March 1918, the Hull River Aboriginal Settlement on the Hull River near Mission Beach on the Australian mainland was destroyed by a cyclone. Palm Island had been gazetted as an Aboriginal reserve on 20 June 1914, although at the time there were few Aboriginal people living on Great Palm. After the cyclone, the residents of Hull River were relocated to Palm Island, with the new population from various Aboriginal peoples – from at least 57 different language groups throughout Queensland and the Torres Strait Islands – later referred to as the Bwgcolman people.

In the first two decades of its establishment the population of Indigenous "inmates" increased from 200 to 1,630. By the early 1920s, Palm Island had become the largest Aboriginal reserve in Queensland and quickly gained a reputation among Aboriginal people as a penal settlement. Indigenous people were removed from across Queensland as punishment for a variety of infringements, including being "half-caste", and sent to Palm Island. New arrivals came after being sentenced by a court or released from prison, or they were sent by administrators of other missions and reserves.

On 3 February 1930, in an incident known as the 1930 Palm Island Tragedy, the first Superintendent of the Settlement, Robert Henry Curry, who had been a strict disciplinarian, shot and wounded two people, and set fire to several buildings, killing his two children. Later in the day, the Superintendent was shot dead. An official inquiry by the Queensland Attorney General followed. Those involved in the shooting of the Superintendent, including the Deputy Superintendent and the Palm Island Medical Officer, were charged with murder, but the Crown Prosecutor was directed by the trial judge to drop the charges, stating that the shooting was justified.

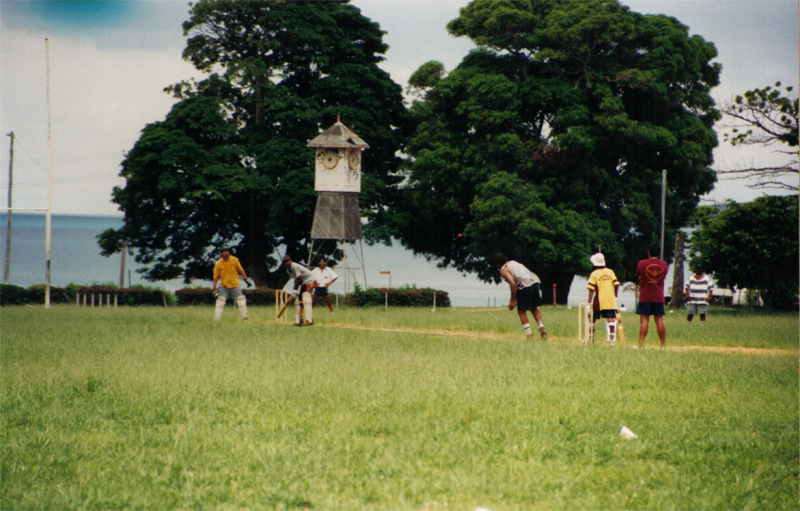
Locals playing cricket with the bell tower in the background (1996)

A bell tower was built to dictate the running of the mission. The bell would ring each morning at eight, a signal for everyone to line up for parade in the mission square. Those who failed to line up had their food allocation cut. At nine each evening the bell would ring again, signalling the shutting down of the island's electricity. The bell tower still stands in the local square to this day, a relic of Palm Island's history.

After 12 Oct 1939, when the Aboriginals Preservation and Protection Act 1939 and Torres Strait Islander Act 1939 were passed, the name changed from Palm Island Aboriginal Settlement to Director of Native Affairs Office, Palm Island. These Acts effected a change in policy: instead of protection and segregation of Indigenous people, it instead focussed on assimilation into the "white community". They gave freedom and full citizenship rights to Aboriginal people who qualified for these, but also streamlined the administration and development of Aboriginal reserves. The Director of Native Affairs Office was superseded by the Aboriginal and Island Affairs Department on 28 April 1966. The functions were transferred to the Aboriginal and Island Affairs Department, District Office, Palm Island.

Palm Island Aboriginal Settlement was mentioned in the Bringing Them Home Report (1997) as an institution that housed children removed from their families, part of the Stolen Generation.

==== 1943–44: WW2 use as US airbase ====
In July 1943 the US Navy built a naval air station at Palm Island, with facilities to operate and overhaul Catalina flying boats and patrol boats. The air station was built at Wallaby Point, an isolated area of Palm Island, overlooking a large stretch of sheltered water in Challenger Bay, which was ideal for flying boat operations. The station was built by two officers and 122 enlisted men of Company C of the 55th Naval Construction Battalion (Seabee) that arrived 6 July 1943, and a similar detachment that left Brisbane later with 1,500 tons of construction material.

A 1,000-man camp was constructed at the point. Concrete flying boat ramps to the ocean were built with a tarmac parking area for up to 12 flying boats. Moorings for 18 flying boats were provided in Challenger Bay, and three nose hangars were also built. Coral aggregate from coral reefs at low tide was used to manufacture concrete. A series of fuel tanks were constructed to hold 60,000 barrels of aviation fuel. Steel rail lines were installed to launch the PBY Catalinas back into the water.

By September 1943 the majority of the facilities were finished, and large numbers of operational and maintenance personnel began to arrive to commission the station. The Palm Island US Naval Air Station was fully operational from 25 October 1943, and could repair an average of four aircraft per day. The last personnel of the 55th Seabees left Palm Island on 8 November 1943. US Navy Patrol Squadron 101, Patrol Wing 10, with eight PBY Catalinas was briefly stationed at Palm Island in December 1943, before relocating to Perth. US Navy Patrol Squadron VP-11 arrived at the station in late December 1943, where they were taken off combat duties. The squadron comprised 13 PBY-5 Catalinas, 46 officers and 99 enlisted men. They carried out training and routine flights between Port Moresby, Samarai and Brisbane. They were assigned to Fleet Air Wing 17 while at Palm Island, and left in February 1944.

The Naval Air Station closed in May 1944. On 18 June 1944, 177 men and 4 officers of Company B, 91st Naval Construction Battalion, arrived from Milne Bay to dismantle the station's buildings and facilities, removing and crating over 5,000 tons of materials and equipment and loading it aboard ship before departing on 31 August 1944.

The remains of the steel rails and submerged wrecks of a number of Catalinas can still be seen today.

==== 1957: Strike ====
One of the harshest Superintendents was Roy Bartlam, who arrested workers for being a minute behind the roll call in the reserve.

All Islanders were required to work 30 hours each week, and up until the 1960s no wages were paid for this work. The catalyst for the strike was the attempted deportation of Indigenous inmate Albie Geia who committed the offence of disobeying the European overseer. The strike was also against the harsh conditions imposed by Bartlam, low or no wages, as well as poor housing and rations. Bartlam was forced to flee to his office and call for reinforcements. Armed Police arrived by RAAF launch from Townsville, and the "ringleaders" and their families were deported in chains to other Aboriginal settlements.

Seven families were banished from the Palm Island in 1957 for taking part in a strike organised to protest against the Dickensian working conditions imposed by the Queensland Government under the reserve system. Athlete Cathy Freeman's mother, Cecilia Barber, and the family of strike ringleader Frederick William Doolan including Billy Doolan Jnr. were among those banished from the island.

In a 2007 commemorative ceremony the Queensland Government apologised to the surviving wives of two of the strikers for the actions of the Government in the 1950s.

==== 1979: Mystery disease ====
The Palm Island mystery disease was an outbreak of a hepatitis-like illness on Great Palm Island, reported in 1979. Associated in many cases with dehydration and bloody diarrhoea, 148 people (138 children and 10 adults) of Aboriginal and Torres Strait Islander descent were affected.

==== 1985–2020: Palm Island "Stolen Wages" Case ====
1985 and 1986, several Aboriginal people who had formerly worked for the Queensland Government on the Palm Island reserve lodged a complaint of racial discrimination under the Racial Discrimination Act 1975 (RDA), alleging underpayment of wages between 31 October 1975 (the RDA start date) and 31 May 1984, when the Palm Island Aboriginal Council took over governance of the Aboriginal reserve land on 10 of the islands in the group, including Great Palm Island. In 1996, the Human Rights and Equal Opportunity Commission found in favour of the applicants, in Bligh and Ors v State of Queensland [1996] HREOCA 28 that "...payment to be made to an Aboriginal worker doing the same work and providing the same level of skills had necessarily to be less". A$7,000 was awarded to each applicant, although the evidence suggested that the loss of income A$8,573.66 to A$20,982.97.

Following this case, the government settled 5,729 claims with a single payment of A$7,000 under the Award Wages Process, established in May 1999, to Indigenous people employed by the government on Aboriginal reserves between 1975 and 1986 (the date their policy of paying below-award rates to Indigenous people officially ended).

In July 2019, it was announced that the Queensland Government had agreed to a A$190 million settlement to a group of about 10,000 Aboriginal and Torres Strait Islander people, who had launched a class action filed 2016 in the Federal Court of Australia. Their claim argued that the Queensland Government "breached the trust of Aboriginal people by failing to protect their money".

==== 1999: Guinness Book of Records controversy ====
The 1999 edition of the Guinness Book of Records brought international attention to Palm Island when it named the island "the most violent place on earth outside a combat zone". To support this claim it stated statistics such as a murder rate 15 times higher than that of the entire state of Queensland, a life expectancy of 40 years, the highest rate of youth suicide per capita in the world, and a total of 40 suicide fatalities over a period of only five years.

The Australian newspaper hypothesised that the Guinness Book of Records statement was based on an article in a London newspaper. The article from The Sunday Times stated that Palm Island had one of the highest crime rates in the world and that "boys ride bareback on horses through the near-derelict civic centre as infants ambush passing cars with slingshots." It referred to violence statistics and stated that "the white overseers" left the island in 1985, removing most of the island's assets and resources, only allowing a pub to remain. The Sunday Times claimed that up to 30 people live in each house, without sufficient drinking water. The figures were strongly disputed at the time by the Queensland Government, the Police Commissioner and the Palm Island Community Council. However, it was conceded by the Queensland Aboriginal Policy Minister, Judy Spence, that Palm Island "can be violent at times", particularly for women and children, but that the situation was being improved.

=== 21st century ===
==== 2004: Death in custody, riot and consequences ====
Australian Aboriginal Palm Island resident, Mulrunji (known as Cameron Doomadgee while alive), aged 36, died in November 2004 in a police cell on Palm Island, one hour after being picked up for allegedly causing a public nuisance. The family of the deceased were informed by the Coroner that the death was the result of "an intra-abdominal haemorrhage caused by a ruptured liver and portal vein".

A week after the death the results of the autopsy report were read to a public meeting by then Palm Island Council Chairwoman Erykah Kyle. A succession of angry young Aboriginal men subsequently spoke to the crowd and encouraged immediate action be taken against the police. Mulrunji's death was repeatedly branded "cold-blooded murder", and a riot erupted. The local courthouse, police station and police barracks were burned down and 18 local police and their families were forced to withdraw and barricade themselves in the hospital. Later the same day approximately 80 police from Townsville and Cairns were flown to Palm to restore order.

In April 2005, in response to the riot, Premier Peter Beattie established the Palm Island Select Committee to investigate issues leading to the riot and other problems. Their report was tabled on 25 August 2005, detailing 65 recommendations which seek to reduce violence and overcrowding, and improve standards of education and health. In achieving these objectives, issues such as drug and alcohol abuse and unemployment would also be addressed.

In late September 2006, coroner Christine Clements found that Doomadgee was killed as a result of punches by the Senior Sergeant arresting officer. Despite the finding of the coroner, Leanne Clare, the Queensland Director of Public Prosecutions (DPP), announced on 14 December 2006 that no charges would be laid. After media and public pressure, the Queensland Attorney-General appointed former Chief Justice of the Supreme Court of New South Wales, Sir Laurence Street to review the decision. The Street Review resulted in the overturning of the DPP's decision, with a finding that there was sufficient evidence to prosecute for manslaughter. A high-profile trial in the Townsville Supreme Court ensued. In June 2007 the jury found the Senior Sergeant not guilty of manslaughter and assault charges. On 24 October 2008, a jury found Lex Wotton, a two-time councillor on the Palm Island Aboriginal Shire Council, guilty of inciting the 2004 riot that resulted in the destruction of the island's police station, the courthouse, and an officer's residence. Wotton then was sentenced to seven years in prison, reduced to six years for time already served.

The Crime and Misconduct Commission examined police relations in Queensland and as part of this, conducted an inquiry into police handling of the Mulrunji investigation. In 2010 it reported that more work was needed on police relations, while noting that some improvement had occurred, recommending 51 specific actions.

The police raids and behaviour following the riot were found in December 2016 to have breached the Racial Discrimination Act 1975, with a record class action settlement of A$30 million awarded to victims in May 2018. The raids were found by the court to be "racist" and "unnecessary, disproportionate" with police having "acted in these ways because they were dealing with an Aboriginal community".

==== 2020: First Indigenous Senior PSOs ====
On 2 October 2020, six Palm Islanders graduated as Senior Protective Security Officers and joined the Queensland Police Service. After the graduation ceremony at Fred Clay Park, the group became the first SPSOs to provide security services for the community.

== Geography ==
At 55 km^{2} (21 sq mi), Great Palm Island is nearly twice the size of Norfolk Island and of a similar size to Magnetic Island. It is the main island of the Greater Palm group, and consists of small bays, sandy beaches and steep forested mountains rising to a peak of 548 metres (1,798 ft).

Bays of Great Palm Island, listed clockwise starting at north
Bay	Notes
Cannon (Numbullabudgee)	by Wallaby (Nullaree) Point
Bullumbooroo	
North East (Othoorakool)	
Barber	within view of Barber (Boodthean) Island
Mundy	
Butler (Surrumbroo)	at the southeast end of the airport
Pencil	
Casement	at the northwest end of the airport
Regina	
Coolgood	has a pier, a settled area is inland
Coolgaree Bay	a settled area is inland

Topographically, the island is dominated in the centre by the tallest peak Mount Bentley, and in the southwest by Mount Lindsay. The surface is covered by rainforest, with small areas cleared for settlements and the airstrip. The Palm Island airstrip is on a long narrow strip at the southwest corner of the island.

There are three man-made bodies of fresh water on the island, including Bamboo Dam near the peak of Mount Bentley, and Solomon Dam.

=== The surrounding ocean ===
The ocean surrounding the island is inside the Great Barrier Reef in the Coral Sea, and part of the Great Barrier Reef Marine Park, where extraction and fishing are regulated. The island forms the eastern boundary of Halifax Bay. Under the zoning authority of the Great Barrier Reef Marine Park Authority (GBRMPA), the ocean on the western side of the island is in a Habitat Protection zone. The rest of the island is surrounded by a Conservation zone. These zones exist to protect the park from excess extraction and fishing.

There are seven named reefs adjacent to the island, known as nearshore fringing reefs. The designation of the seven varies; for example, the seventh of the seven is called Great Palm Reef (No 7), 18-054G, Great Palm Reef G, and Reef 18054G. As designated by the GBRMPA, Great Palm Island has the number 18-054, and the seven reefs are a, b, c, d, e, f, and g.

Surrounding waters include Challenger (Gowyarowa) Bay, which is between Great Palm Island, Curacoa (Noogoo), and Fantome Islands.

=== Climate ===
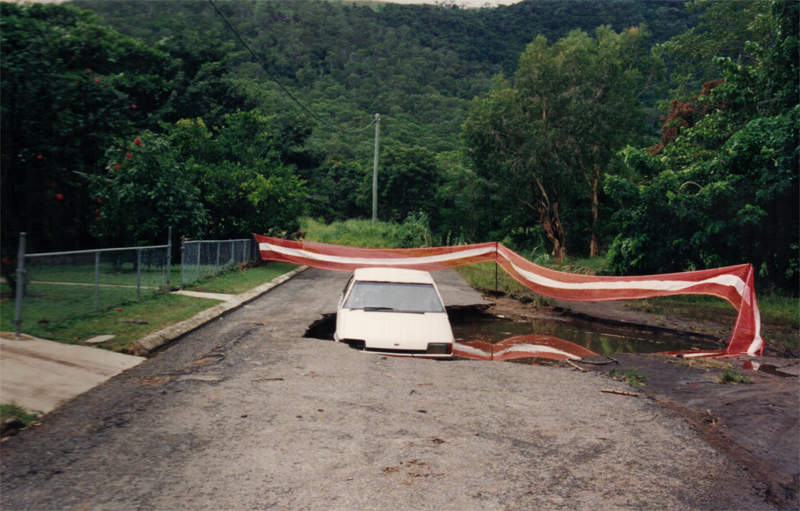
Aftermath of Cyclone Justin

The island group lies in the tropical zone, and experience a tropical monsoon climate, and thus vulnerable to cyclones.

In March 1997 Cyclone Justin passed over the Cairns coastline and remained near Great Palm Island causing a great deal of flash flooding. Peaking at Category 4, at landfall it was a Category 2 cyclone; it caused significant damage in the Cairns region during its relatively long, 3½ week life.

In April 2000 category 2 Cyclone Tessi passed directly over Great Palm Island, but caused little damage.

== Environment ==
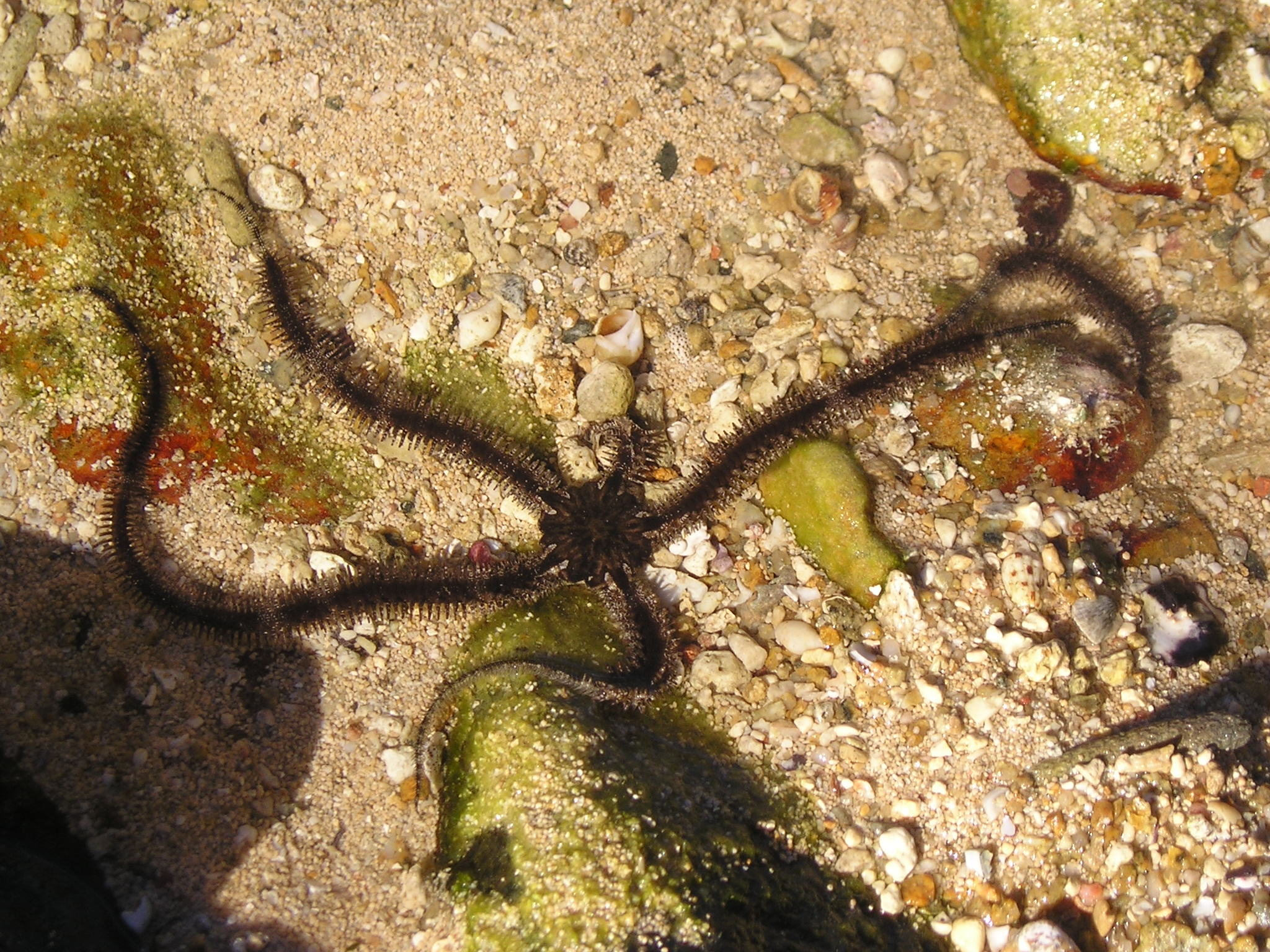
Brittle star

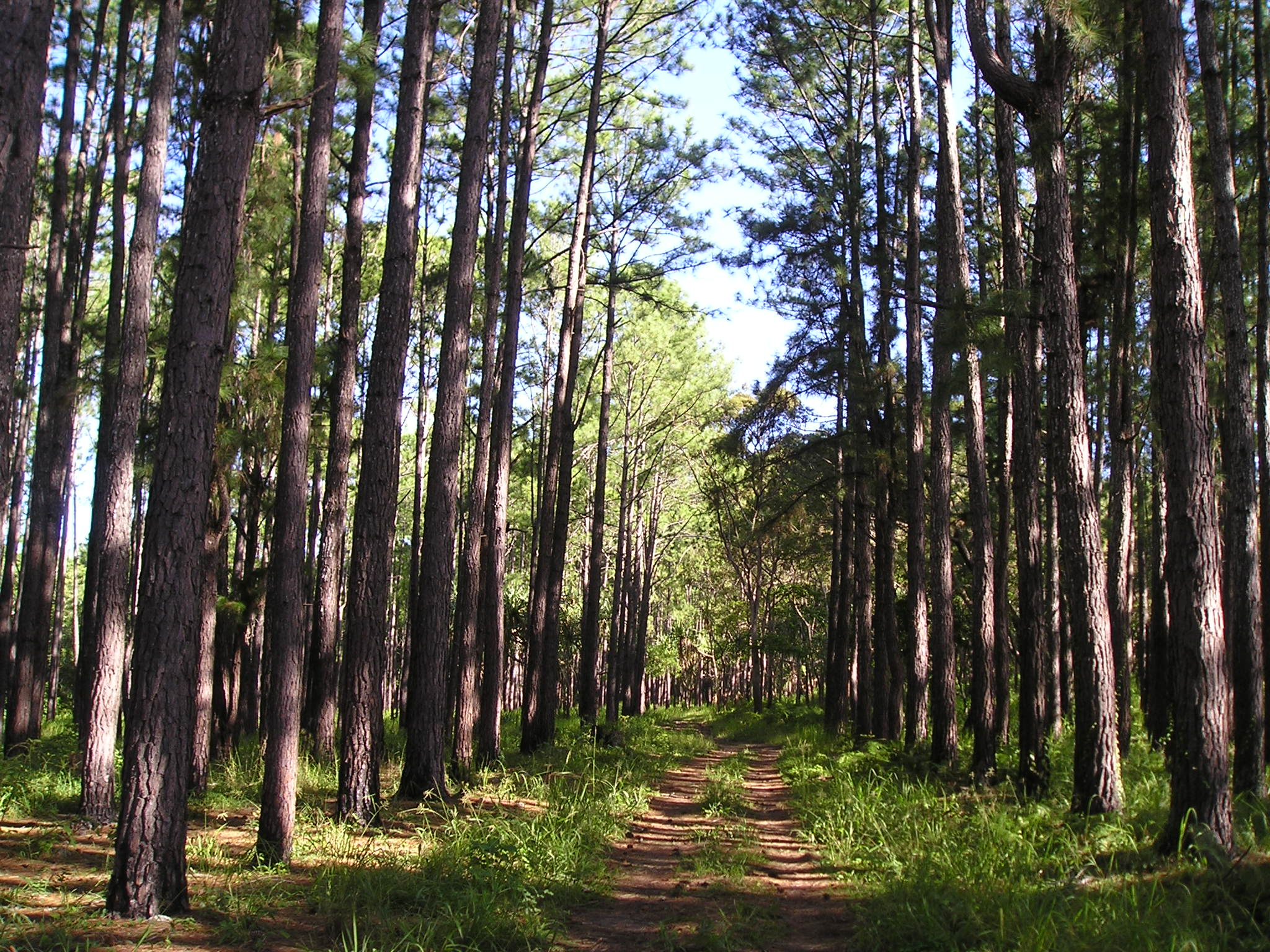
Pine plantation on Great Palm Island

Great Palm Island's rich volcanic soil supports tropical flora such as mangroves, eucalypt forest, rainforests, hoop pine, mango, banana, pawpaw (papaya) and wild plum trees. The surrounding bays have diverse marine fauna, including coral trout, crayfish and coral reefs.

However the island has been affected by human settlement and introduced species.

There are hundreds of brumbies (feral horses) on the island, considered to be owned by the community. In 2003 there were reports of horses having been tortured and beaten by local teenagers. The problem of the feral animals had been brought to the attention of the Palm Island authorities as well as the Queensland Government, but to no avail. An RSPCA representative said that they needed to involve the children in helping to solve the problem. Since then, the Shire Council and the RSPCA have acted to care for the horses and educate residents, and children are now engaged in helping to round up troublesome animals.

Feral dogs are also a problem on the island.

== People and governance ==
Local government on the island is provided by the Palm Island Aboriginal Shire Council, which has jurisdiction over ten of the islands in the Greater Palm group, created under the Local Government (Community Government Areas) Act 2004(2004). (Previously, Palm Island was a community council without the same powers as other Queensland Shire Councils. Final transition to full Shire Council status was completed in January 2007.

Australia Post lists only one postcode for "Palm Island, QLD" (4816), which refers to the island group.

=== Settlements ===
There are no formal names for the settled areas of the island. The main town area on the west coast, next to the jetty where the ferries dock, has no formal name, and is still called "the Mission" by some of the locals. The main town has the government centre, schools, shops, a football club, hospital and churches, as well as a library called the Bwgcolman Indigenous Knowledge Centre. The first stage of the Bwgcolman Retail Centre opened in February 2020, its facade decorated with the work of three local artists. The completed retail precinct will include a supermarket, council offices, and a tourist information centre with art gallery. A new group of artists, the Palm Island Arts group, will occupy the studio and gallery in the new building.

There is another settled area is at the south-east end of the airport, south of the main town area, and beyond a mountain to the north is a third settled area on Coolgaree Bay.

=== Demographics ===
At the 2016 census, "Palm Island (Urban Centres and Localities)" had 2,298 residents, 94.1% of whom are of Indigenous origin. Of these, 75.2% were Australian Aboriginal, 12.8% Torres Strait Islander.

=== Land title ===
There is no freehold land title on Palm Island, with property owned by either the Local or State Government. Native title claims do not apply to most residents as they are not the original inhabitants of the land, the general community (Bwgcolman people) do have a strong historical connection to the land, most having been born there. Having "historical" (as opposed to "traditional") rights recognised is a legal grey area. Freehold title does not apply either; most land is controlled by the Palm Island Aboriginal Shire Council. The land is held by the council for the benefit of the community in trust, through a Deed of Grant in Trust (DOGIT). This means that, for example, a third party would not be able to lease and develop land on Palm Island without the permission of the community, and even then leases are limited to 30 years.

All homes are on crown land, owned by the Shire Council and rented at a Government-subsidised rate to residents. Most businesses are owned by the council and land title restrictions hinder private investment; approval to build a house or start a business can take up to three years.

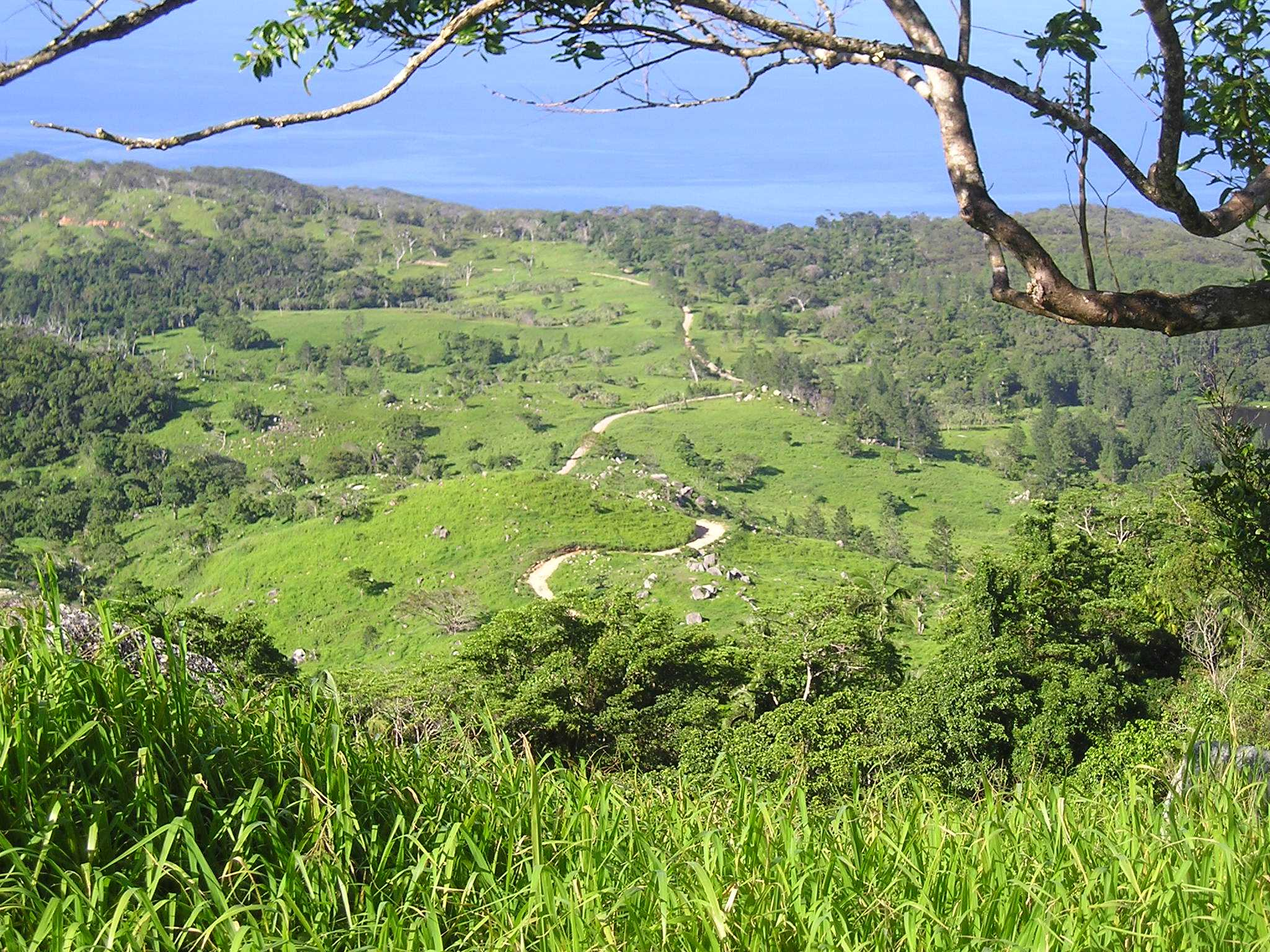
Road up Mount Bently, Palm Island

Privatising home ownership and the creation of a market economy with longterm leases has been seen by some as the best option to move forward on Palm. The push for privatisation of title was led by the Australian Government (through Mal Brough, as Indigenous Affairs Minister), Noel Pearson (of the Cape York Institute for Policy and Leadership), and some families on the island. However other Islanders were suspicious of these moves as an opportunity for the more powerful families to gain more power through land ownership or even worse a way of taking land off the Palm Islanders, who in desperation may sell to the highest bidding developer even if that bid significantly undervalues the land in question. Professor Mick Dodson, then director of the Centre for Indigenous Studies at the ANU, argued that the people on Palm Island do not have the financial capacity (owing to lack of available jobs) to compete in the housing market on a commercial basis; the only solution to the problem of overcrowding lies in increasing the level of public housing.

Traditional ownersTraditional ownership of the Manbarra people complicates debate about Palm Island land title. There is no registered Native Title claim and few traditional owners still live on the island.

The Queensland Government, which has constitutional responsibility for land tenure, holds the position that this issue is extremely complex and that it will not be bullied by the Commonwealth.

== Economy ==
As a result of the 20th century use as an Aboriginal reserve/penal settlement, with the residents/inmates drawn from all over Queensland, the island population is now a mix of Manbarra and other Aboriginal peoples, with few jobs and a shortage of housing. The community created by this history has been beset by many problems and has often been the discussion point of political and social commentators. Since its creation as an Aboriginal reserve, Palm Island has been considered synonymous with Indigenous disadvantage and violence. At the same time it has been at the forefront of political activism which has sought to improve the conditions and treatment of Indigenous Australians, as well as redress injustices visited on them broadly and on Palm Island specifically.

The unemployment rate was about 51% in September 2019.

As of 2004 there was no industry on the island despite rich natural resources such as crayfish and enormous tourism potential. Relics of failed or abandoned ventures were still evident: a piggery, chicken farm, disused stockyards, market garden and a joinery works.

Cost of living is relatively very high on Palm Island due to the remoteness of island living and the general lack of private enterprise. In 2007 a loaf of bread cost about twice the average cost in the rest of Australia. The 2000 Dillon Report found that the cost of living issue was exacerbated by economic loss to alcohol abuse, drug dependence and gambling, and the fact that crops and livestock are not cultivated locally on the island.

The natural environment of Palm Island and adjacent Halifax Bay is ideal for the aquaculture of oysters, shrimp, prawns and mackerel. Over a five-year period in the 1970s Applied Ecology Pty Ltd (an organisation designed to assist Aboriginal communities to develop sustainable industries, funded by the Government) established an oyster lease on Palm Island. At one point the lease had A$600,000 worth of oysters. Due to alleged poor management and lack of interest among the community the oyster lease fell into disrepair. The farm is purported to have cost $20 million.

In 2020, a A$10 million retail and business centre was completed, mostly funded by the Federal Government, with A$1 contributed by Queensland Government. Until now, locals have spent millions in shopping in Townsville, and it is hoped to channel some of this into the Island, and create local jobs and opportunities for business ownership. With an incoming flow of money to the island in the form of compensation under the A$30 million class action payment for the 2004 riots, and some of the stolen wages settlement, there would be a need for all sectors to work on improving financial literacy in the community. There is potential for further development of the tourism industry. Mayor Alf Lacey says that land tenure is still a problem, and having some freehold land would drive economic independence.

== Tourism ==
Some attempts have been made to develop a tourist industry on Great Palm Island, but these have met with limited success. Although the island has tropical rainforest and is rich in diverse flora and fauna, is close to the Great Barrier Reef and its waters abound with tropical fish, making it an ideal spot for eco-tourism, there have been concerns owing to its troubled history and social problems, and its residents need to be ready to embrace the idea of a possible flood of visitors.

Research by the Centre for Tropical Urban and Regional Planning at James Cook University in 2007 concluded that Palm Island has most of the resources it needs to be largely self-sufficient through housing, agriculture and tourism. However it has long been thought that the tourism potential of the island is hindered by the negative reputation that Palm Island has had.

A new tourism initiative in 2015 included holding an open day on the island and having groups of tourists travel to the island to experience traditional food, and experience other aspects of Indigenous culture, by participating in dot painting and basket weaving workshops. The first open day in 2015 was sold out, with over 200 paying tourists, and more were planned throughout the year.

In April 2018, the people of the Island marked a hundred years since the establishment of the Aboriginal settlement, with a three-day "Deadly Didge and Dance Festival". Local talent, pride and resilience was shown using dance, song and ceremony. Aboriginal elders spoke wanted to dispel the Island's reputation as a place of violent crime (including the effect of the Guinness Book of Records listing Palm Island as "the most violent place on earth outside a combat zone" in 1999), saying that there were now more opportunities for young people to get educated and contribute to the community and the economy.

There are limited facilities and accommodation on Great Palm Island for tourists. Accommodation includes Klub Kuda, and the Palm Island Motel, which is operated by the council.

== Social problems ==
In 2006 it was reported that the community suffered from chronic alcohol, drug and domestic abuse, high unemployment and an average life expectancy of 50 years, 30 less than the Australian average. Economist Helen Hughes wrote in 2007 that the state of affairs was largely due to the establishment of the "penal settlement in 1918 for Aborigines unwilling to be docile, underpaid bush and domestic workers", and historical and current "apartheid-like" policies: the Queensland Government was failing the community by "stalling the Commonwealth's efforts to improve policing, education and health and to introduce private property rights".

=== Community planning ===
The May 1998 Palm Island Vision Plan, a community planning document developed by the community, identified a number of priorities for action to improve the physical, social and emotional well-being of Islanders, especially young people (who comprised 63% of the population at that time). Unfortunately the project did not gain full support from other departments and had objectives and timeframes which were in retrospect seen as over-ambitious; the project failed to secure enough funding to support its plans, and in February 2000 Queensland Health withdrew from the project.

In July 2000, a Community Renewal Plan was started, based on the Vision Plan. Key themes were "improved outcomes for young people; self-esteem and community pride; training and employment; health and safety; and economic development". As part of this project, a youth and community centre was built, two technology centres were established at local schools, a course in first aid was offered, and a program of short courses and employment opportunities for young people aged 15–19 who had dropped out of school.

In 2005 another forum was convened to find solutions to some of the key issues facing the community, building on the work already done in the Vision Plan and the Community Renewal plans. The Palm Island: Future Directions report resulting from the project said that the Palm Island community and the Queensland and Federal Governments needed to jointly act to change living standards on the Island. It acknowledged that the problems facing the Palm Island community were not the making of the Palm Island residents, but resulted from unresolved trauma of dislocation, long-term under-funding and poor decision-making of successive Queensland governments since 1918. However the community also had a role to play in improving the future for young people, which should include fostering relationships with both non-profit and commercial organisations, outside of the government sector. For its part, the government needed to "facilitate major structural reform by providing adequate resources, removing impediments, altering governmental and bureaucratic attitudes, providing coordinated and flexible services, and helping to create an environment that encourages personal empowerment and private investment in the community". Four key areas of focus were land, governance, economic development and justice. The report said that conditions at Palm Island resembled those of a developing country.

=== Law and order ===
From 1975 to the early 21st century, Palm Island has had a very high level of theft, domestic violence, sexual assaults against children and alcohol abuse.

==== 1985 Wilson analysis ====
In 1985, then associate professor of Sociology Paul Wilson published a criminological analysis of criminal statistics averaged over the period of January 1977 to May 1984.

Estimated violence rates per 100 000 people 1976/77 to 1981/82
	Aboriginal communities	Queensland	Palm Island
Homicide	39.6	6.15	94.3
Serious assault	226.1	45.9	929.9

Wilson considered the Palm Island rates to be a gross underestimate, as the figures provided by the Legal Aid Office only counted cases that went to court, whereas the Queensland rates, provided by the Australian Bureau of Statistics, were based on reported incidents. The Palm Island figures demonstrated that 86% of violence involved the offender exhibiting heavy drinking patterns and in most cases the victim was also drinking. 38% of incidents involved people who were married or in a de facto relationship, and, of those, 90% of the offenders were male. At the time, alcohol was limited to beer sold in the canteen between the hours of 5 pm and 9 pm, and spirits were banned; however there was a flourishing sly-grog trade.

Wilson attributed the extreme crime rates to historical (including repression and colonial practices,) social, economic, housing and educational factors, and an "alcohol culture" that perceived not drinking to be antisocial. Further contributing factors were the employment circumstances of Palm Island and the destruction of society and traditional culture and structures. He cited research rejecting an Aboriginal propensity for violence and contrasted the Aurukun community where no homicides had been recorded in the period from the 1950s.

==== Crime prevention programs ====
The most successful program implemented to reduce the high levels of crime was the Palm Island Community Justice Group (CJG), established in 1992 as a committee of elders, who have more influence over young offenders on the island than the police or courts. The CJG has a statutory role within the judicial system in administering justice on the island. It is funded by the Queensland Government to administer the program, created in response to the Royal Commission into Aboriginal Deaths in Custody, with the aim of keeping Indigenous children on Palm out of the criminal justice system. Under the program, the Palm Island community is encouraged to devise their own systems for dealing with offenders. In the three years after the Community Justice Group was established, Palm Island juveniles appearing before magistrates courts fell by a third. Police and the courts often refer offenders to the Community Justice Group.

As of March 2020, the CJG "provides a platform for the Palm Island Aboriginal Shire Council and other relevant agencies to consult on law and order matters...to ensure that justice-related issues impacting on the Palm Island community are addressed collectively with a focus on the development of intervention programs". Since 2008, the Palm Island Community Company is the agency providing guidance and support to the CJG. Many members of the CJG, are Palm Island elders, who meet monthly. The company also runs a childcare centres, medical centre, services for women and families, and a domestic violence specialist group.

Various other local programs have assisted with lowering the crime rate: the Men's Group, with founding member and director Lex Wotton ran a prison cell visitors program, a support service, and a children's night patrol. In 2000, the Palm Island Council used a state government grant to establish a community-run reorientation program for youths to help reduce youth crime and suicide, by relocating wayward youths to a new youth and cultural camp where they would be taught their culture, language and art on neighbouring Fantome Island, a former leprosarium. The Coolgaree Nippers club is the first Indigenous club in Surf Lifesaving Queensland, and is affiliated to Arcadian surf lifesaving club on Magnetic Island. In the first year of operation (1999), juvenile crime rates dropped from 186 offences to 99.

==== Alcohol restrictions ====
One of the findings of the 2001 Fitzgerald report (aka Cape York Justice Study), the result of an investigation into alcohol abuse in Indigenous communities on the Cape York Peninsula, related to communities relying on the income generated by sales of alcohol in canteens, recommending that this perceived conflict of interest end. The Indigenous Communities Liquor Licences Bill 2002 (Qld) and the Community Services Legislation Amendment Bill 2002 were introduced as part of the government response to the report. The Queensland Department of Aboriginal and Torres Strait Islander Policy commissioned a further report in 2005 and, as a result of its recommendations, the ten islands in the Palm Island Aboriginal Shire Council became the 19th Queensland community to become a restricted area for possession of alcohol from 19 June 2006.

As of March 2020, the restrictions applying to the Shire allow each person to bring no more than 11.25 litres (2.47 imp gal; 2.97 US gal) of any liquor with a concentration of less than 4 per cent alcohol. As the barge company and most airlines to the islands do not permit any alcohol on board, the ferry is the only means of carriage of alcohol to Palm Island. Any alcohol brought on board must be locked away during the trip. The only licensed premises in the ten islands is the Coolgaree Bay Sports Bar and Bistro, which requires a valid membership for sales of alcohol, whether for on- or off-premises consumption. Penalties apply to everyone living in, travelling through, visiting or working in the Shire. "Sly grog" sales are prohibited.

=== Health ===
In December 1934 there was a major outbreak of influenza, with a large number of residents hospitalised.

In 1979 an outbreak of an illness known as the Palm Island mystery disease, was reported in 138 children and 10 adults of Indigenous descent. Later characterised as hepatoenteritis, the disease was proposed to have been caused by the toxin cylindrospermopsin released from cyanobacterial cells after the addition of excessive doses of copper sulfate to the water supply of Solomon Dam to target a bloom of Cylindrospermopsis raciborskii.

The Palm Island Health Action Plan 2018-2028 was launched on Friday 20 April 2018, with a joint commitment by the stakeholders to "Close the Gap" in health care services to achieve "equality in health status and life expectancy between the Aboriginal and Torres Strait Islander peoples on Palm Island and non-Indigenous Australians by 2033", echoing the federal government's Closing the Gap strategy.

== Culture and sport ==
Many residents consider that the introduction of Western culture and the subsequent Mission policies of prohibiting the expression of traditional cultural has seriously eroded the cultural base of Palm Island. Many of the contemporary issues of substance abuse, law and order problems and the high suicide rate have been attributed in part to this absence of culture.

Amongst sporting activities on Palm Island boxing features prominently (both men's and women's) in 2006 11 young Palm Islanders represented Queensland at national boxing championships for the first time. The Barracudas are the local rugby league team, with Vern Daisy as a notable ex-player. In June 2005 the inaugural 3 on 3 Basketball competition was held, attracting over 300 locals.

Many of the sporting activities are actively supported by or managed through the Queensland Police Citizens Youth Welfare Association facility; the Palm Island Community and Youth Centre (PICYC). The centre was opened by the then Premier Peter Beattie in February 2005 over strong community objections due to animosity towards the Queensland Police following the November 2004 death in custody and the Police response to the subsequent riot. Having moved on from a dispute between the State Government and the Palm Island Council over who should run the facility, the situation has become very positive and cooperative, the centre is used for its intended purpose of youth and community engagement through sport and education. Adults and youth use the facility heavily, including a gym for boxing training, facilities for; women's aerobics, ballroom dancing, Indoor Volleyball, 5 on 5 Indoor Soccer, Old-time Dancing, and a mix of conventional and traditional games.

The PICYC, home to the Palm Island Police Citizens Youth Club, is considered to be a great success story, especially considering its controversial beginnings soon after the 2004 death in custody and riot. The centre is mostly staffed by community members who teach the younger generation both traditional and life skills such as weaving and cooking. Additionally to the sporting activities, the centre hosts community growth projects, services and facilities such as a radio service (Bwgcolman Radio), an Internet Café, TAFE cooking classes, after-school and vacation care, monthly discos, drumming groups ($8,000 worth of drums donated by the Queensland Police), Family Movie Nights, and Bingo. The PICYC employs a paid staff of nine locals and one volunteer.

On 10 January 2018 the Queen's Baton Relay scheduled a stopover on Palm Island for the first time in Commonwealth Games history. The stopover was organised under the GC2018 Reconciliation Action Plan.

== Infrastructure and facilities ==
In 2004 the army completed A$10 million worth of work constructing a permanent water-supply dam on the island and upgrading a number of roads.

Transport infrastructure includes Palm Island Airport on the south-west of the Island. Palm Island's pier is in Challenger Bay, with a ferry-boat service travelling to and from Townsville. A barge service operates from Townsville, bringing food, machinery and fuel to the island, and another operating from Lucinda.

The Aboriginal Shire of Palm Island operates the Bwgcolman Indigenous Knowledge Centre on Lot 1 Main Street on Great Palm Island.

The Queensland Government has allowed A$3 million in their state budget for construction of a splash park to provide safe swimming, but the ongoing costs may be prohibitive. By early December 2020, there had been 23 Irukandji jellyfish stings reported during the year, nearly double that of the whole of 2019, at 12.

=== Health facilities ===
Palm Island is serviced by the Joyce Palmer Health Service based at the Palm Island Hospital, completed in 2000, which has an emergency department and a 15-bed general ward. The service is named for Joyce Palmer, a health worker who commenced her work in the 1940s at the Island's old grass hospital, and provided health care to the people of Palm Island for over 40 years.

Full-time doctors at the hospital are on call for after-hours emergencies. The hospital cares for all non-critically ill patients; critical patients are stabilised and transferred to The Townsville Hospital by Royal Flying Doctor Service (RFDS) Emergency Management Queensland (EMQ).

The Queensland Ambulance Service (QAS) began operations on Palm Island in 2000 and took over from the hospital-based service. It runs a stinger prevention program with stinger stations having been established in different locations around the island. There is a Joint Emergency Services Complex houses the Ambulance Service, the fire brigade and local SES unit.

== Education ==
Education infrastructure is comparatively high on Palm Island for a remote low population base. There is State and private primary education locally and secondary education offered up to year twelve on the Island and a campus of the Barrier Reef Institute of TAFE. Some students chose to board on the main land at private schools.

However educational outcomes are adversely affected by problems faced in home life, particularly; being exposed to serious alcohol and other substance abuse, family violence, exposure to suicides and attempted suicides, balancing cultural and educational demands, living with poverty, child abuse and overcrowded housing. These problems can result in high rates of absenteeism, low self-esteem and little concentration on education. Alternatively, school can be a haven from these external problems; there are many dedicated educators and concerned parents interested in contributing to an effective, viable and culturally appropriate education system on Palm.

The island has two schools; St Michael's Catholic School (Prep to grade 7) and the Education Queensland's Bwgcolman Community School (Prep to Grade 12). The Bwgcolman Community School includes the Bwgcolman Community Library which is jointly managed and funded by the Council and State Government.

The Bwgcolman Community School has 350 students with 50 Indigenous and 27 non-Indigenous staff. The Community School opened on 1 January 1964. Palm Island, like most Aboriginal communities, has difficulties with school attendance, the Principal of St. Michael's has stated that absenteeism averages about 30% among their 160 students. A 2005 test at Bwgcolman school (leaked to the media) showed that the primary school students score "significantly less" than Queensland average in literacy and numeracy. St Michael's have a program of teaching students "dainty" (Australian English) as a third language in addition to the communally spoken "Island English" and the particular language group that the child belongs to.
