= Bamboo Dam =

- Interactive map of Bamboo Dam
- Official name: Bamboo Creek Dam
- Country: Australia
- Location: Great Palm Island, Ingham, Queensland
- Coordinates: 18°44′02″S 146°36′58″E
- Purpose: Water supply
- Status: Completed

Dam and spillways
- Impounds: Bamboo Creek

Bamboo Dam is one of three man-made bodies of fresh water on Great Palm Island, Queensland, Australia, and is located near the peak of Mount Bentley.

After water supply fell to near critical levels, in 2016 it was reported that authorities were considering increasing the height of the Bamboo Dam wall, and linking the water supply with the Minggudjamba Banbarribarra Dam and the Solomon Dam.

== See also ==
- List of reservoirs and dams in Australia
