= PMK =

PMK may refer to:

- Pairwise Master Key in the IEEE 802.11i-2004 protocol
- Palm Island Airport, IATA airport code
- Pattali Makkal Katchi, a political party in Tamil Nadu, India
- People's Movement of Kosovo, a political organization
- Piperonyl methyl ketone, a chemical compound
- PMK gas mask, a Soviet made single-filter gas mask
- Popular Mechanics for Kids, a Canadian TV series
