= Palm Island Airport =

Palm Island
- IATA: PMK; ICAO: YPAM

Summary
- Airport type: Public
- Operator: Aboriginal Shire of Palm Island
- Serves: Palm Island
- Location: Queensland, Australia
- Elevation AMSL: 30 ft / 9 m
- Coordinates: 18°45′19″S 146°34′53″E

Map
- Location in Queensland

Runways
Direction	Length		Surface
Direction	m	ft	Surface
14/32	1,137	3,730	Concrete
- Sources: Australian AIP and aerodrome chart

Palm Island Airport (IATA: PMK, ICAO: YPAM) is an airport in Palm Island, on Great Palm Island, Queensland, Australia.

== Airlines and destinations ==
Airlines	Destinations
Hinterland Aviation	Townsville
West Wing Aviation	Townsville

== Aerial photos and maps ==
- "satellite view of Palm Island Airport" (Map). Google Maps. (requires JavaScript)

== See also ==
- List of airports in Queensland
- Solomon Dam
