= Robert A. Cunningham =

Canadian showman and human zoo impresario

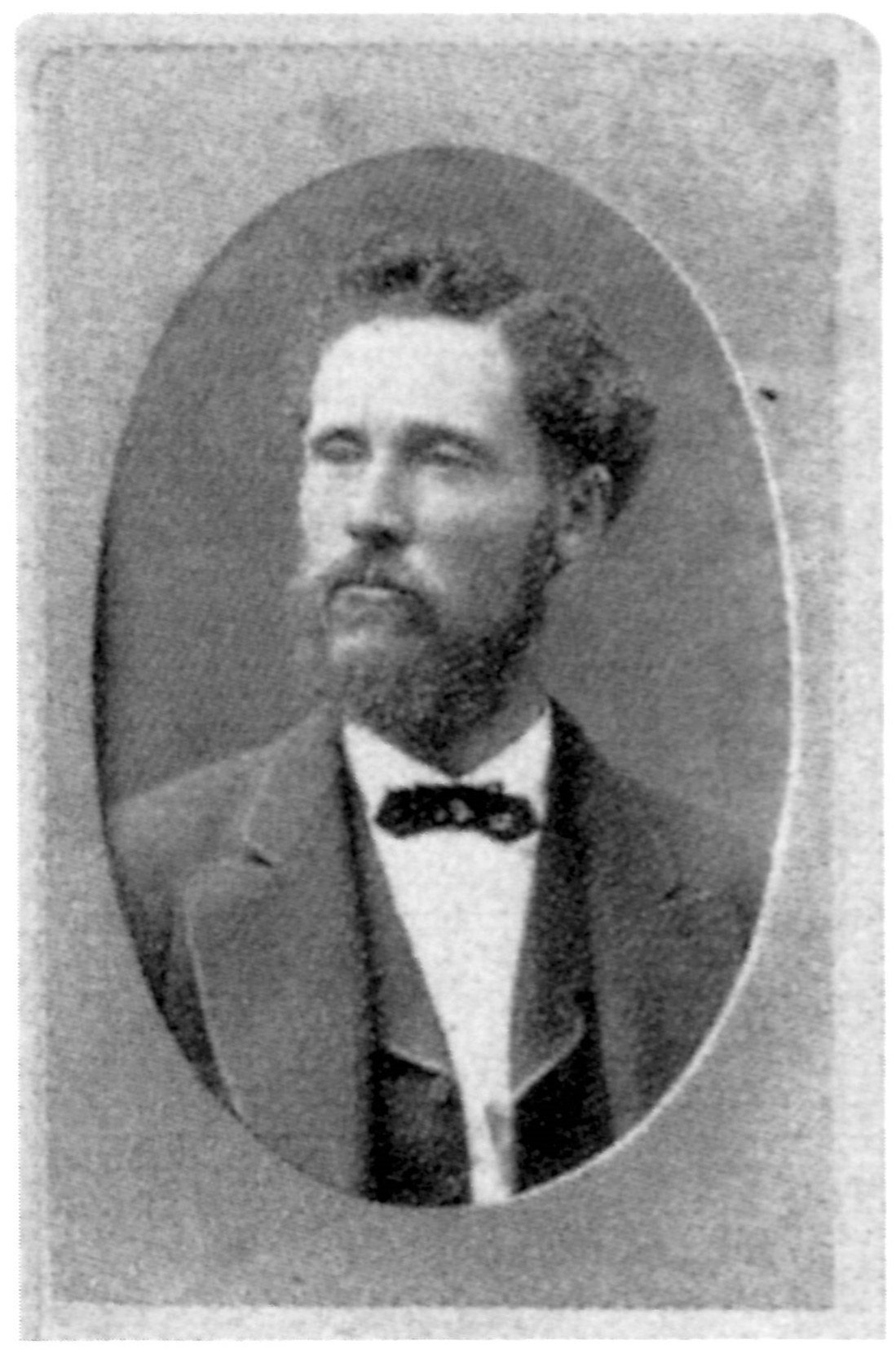
- Robert A. Cunningham in San Francisco
- Born: July 27, 1837; Godmanchester, Quebec
- Died: May 24, 1907 (aged 69); New York, US
- Occupation: Human zoo impresario
- Years active: 1870s-1898
- Known for: Exhibiting indigenous people in 19th-century traveling shows

Robert A. Cunningham (July 27, 1837 – May 24, 1907 in New York) was a Canadian showman and human zoo impresario. He marketed himself similar to his role model and business partner P. T. Barnum, using the initials of his first names as "R. A. Cunningham".

Between 1883 and 1898, Cunningham organised three tours of indigenous people from Australia and Samoa, exhibiting them in so-called "human zoos". Lasting several years each, these shows first travelled through North America and then Europe. The first exhibition of indigenous Australians lasted from 1883 to 1888. Of the nine initially on display, six died. The Samoan exhibition lasted from 1889 to 1891. Of the ten indigenous Samoans, five died. The second exhibition of Australian aboriginals lasted from 1892 to 1898. Of the eight people who initially were part of this group, five died.

== Biography ==
Robert A. Cunningham was born on July 27, 1837 in Godmanchester near Huntingdon in the Canadian province of Quebec. He was one of several children born to farmers Andrew Cunningham and Margaret Emberson. His father Andrew was originally from County Londonderry in Northern Ireland and had emigrated to Canada in 1827.

Robert A. Cunningham travelled to California in 1856 at the age of 18 to try his luck as a miner during the gold rush there. In the towns around the gold fields, he came into contact with the show business industry and initially performed there as a musician. From the 1870s onwards, he worked as a theatre agent, organising performances for circuses, freak shows and variety theatres.

=== First exhibition of "Aborigines" (1883–1888) ===
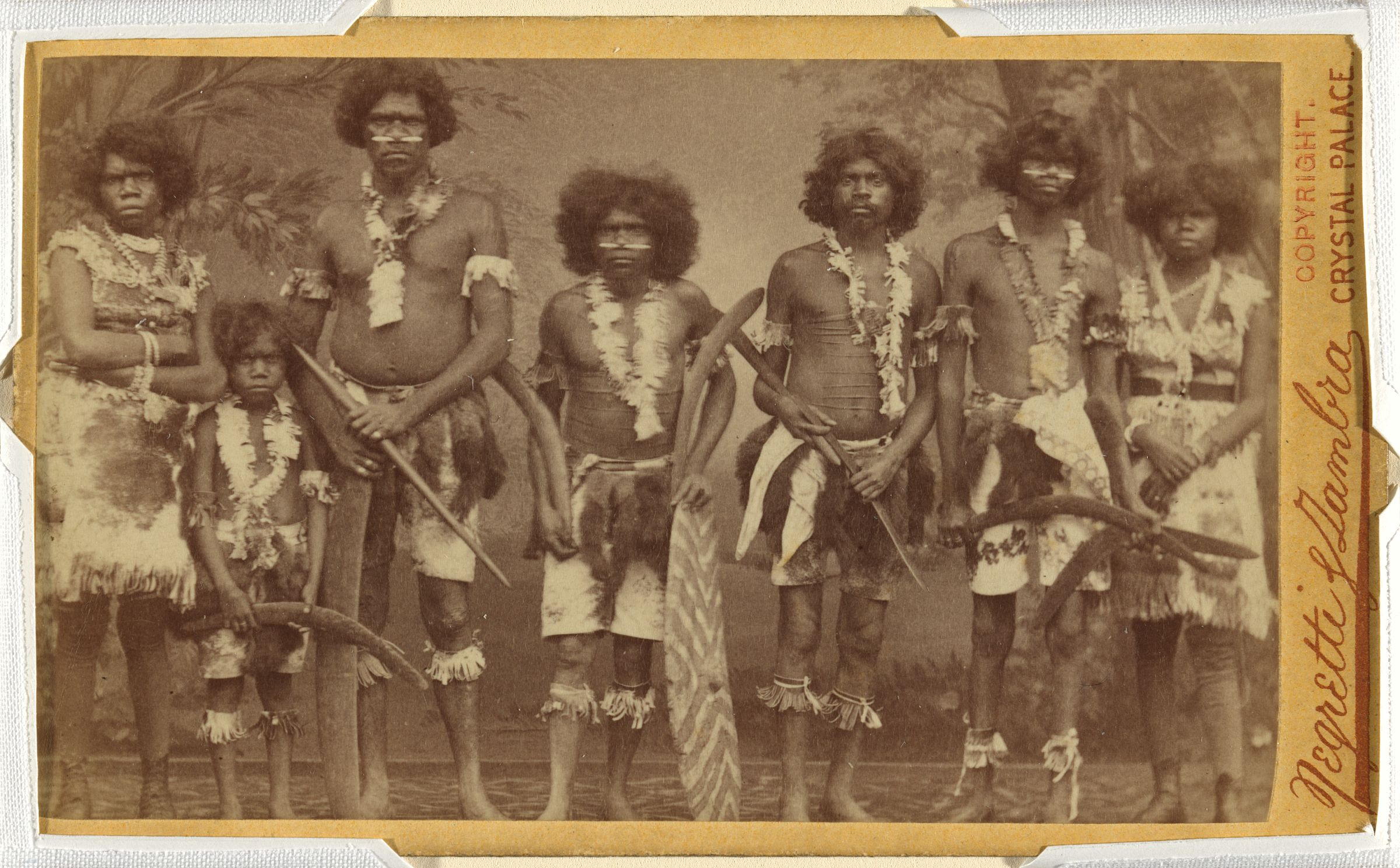
R. A. Cunningham's Australian Aboriginal international touring company, Crystal Palace, London, April 1884

Cunningham first travelled to Australia in July 1879. During his stay in Melbourne in November 1882, he was commissioned by the then well-known American showman P. T. Barnum to bring a group of Australian aboriginals to the United States. In January 1883, he abducted, as he himself later claimed on several occasions, a group of nine Australian aboriginals from Palm Island and Hinchinbrook Island in northern Australia.

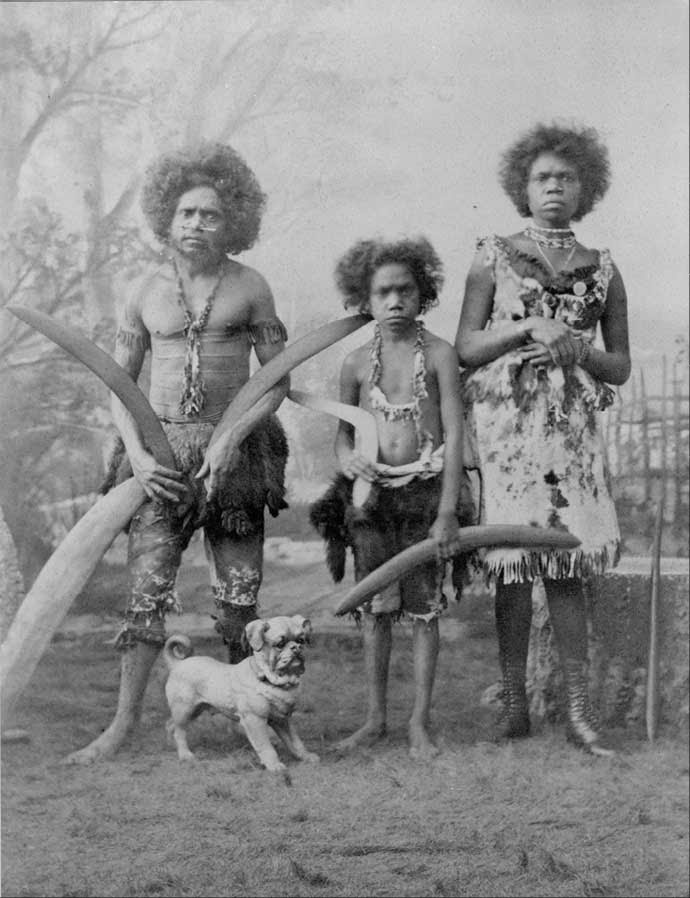
Group of three surviving aboriginals, Billy, Toby and Jenny, photograph by Roland Bonaparte, 1885 in Paris

In 1883, his exhibition of "Aborigines" initially travelled together with P. T. Barnum's "Ethnological Congress of Strange Savage Tribes" through numerous cities in the United States, where the "Aborigines" were stigmatised as "Ranting Man-Eaters." Independently of this, Cunningham also had his group perform in amusement parks and curiosity cabinets of all kinds.

In February 1884, a man named Kukamunburra or Tambo, a woman named Tagarah and another member of the group died of infectious diseases in Cleveland. Cunningham left Tambo's body to the owner of the local Dime Museum, who had it embalmed and displayed in a glass case. The display case was rediscovered in 1993, and Tambo's body was subsequently transferred to Australia and buried on Palm Island in 1994.

After the death of the two men, Cunningham decided to continue the human zoo tour in Europe, where the "Aborigines" were first exhibited in London in April, then in Paris and Brussels. From June onwards his shows continued in Cologne and numerous other cities of the German Empire as one of the popular exhibitions known as Völkerschau. A brochure has been preserved from the human zoos held in Germany, in which the "Aborigines" were advertised as follows:

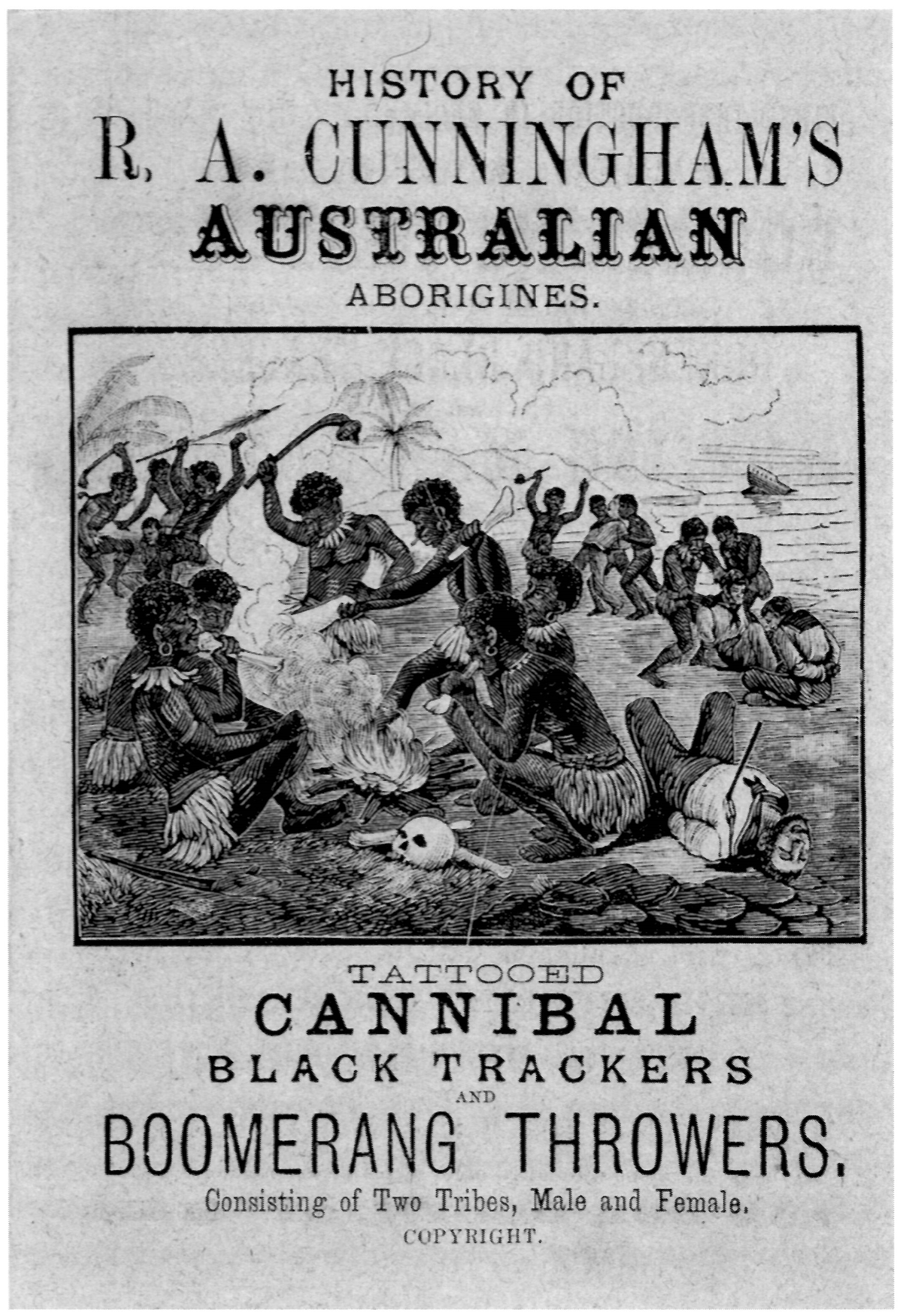
Title page of a brochure in English for the human zoo of 1884 with scenes of cannibalism

Male and female Australian Cannibals / R.A. Cunningham, Director / The first and only obtained colony of these strange, savage, disfigured and most brutal race ever lured from the remote interior wilds, where they indulge in ceaseless bloody feuds and forays to feast upon each other's flesh / The very lowest order of mankind, and beyond conception most curious to look upon.

During the tour of Germany that lasted more than a year, four other members of the group also died of infectious diseases in 1885. Cunningham continued the tour with the three surviving "Aborigines" over the next three years through a number of European countries, including Scandinavia, Russia and Southern Europe and probably took them back to Townsville in April 1888.

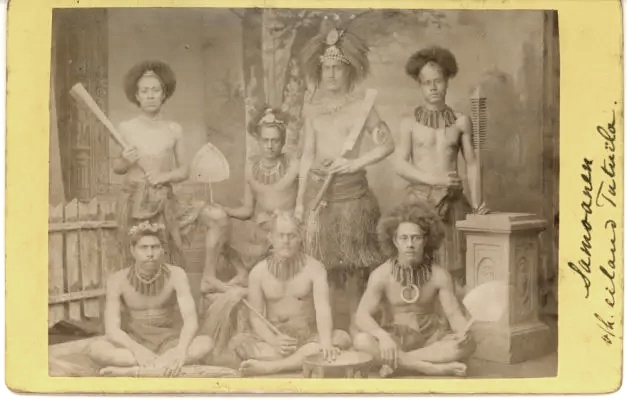
Studio photograph of seven men of the Samoan human zoo, 1890

=== Exhibition of "Samoans" (1889–1891) ===
From 1889 onwards, Cunningham organised a human zoo exhibition featuring ten Samoans. As he presented the group in winter without adequate clothing, five members soon died. Cunningham left the five survivors behind in New York, where a journalist from the New York World newspaper found them in a desolate condition. The journalist accompanied them back to their homeland at the expense of the State of New York and the newspaper.

=== Second exhibition of "Aborigines" (1892–1898) ===
In 1892, Cunningham recruited another group of eight "Aborigines" with whom he toured both North America and Europe. During the second six-year exhibition, five members of the group died. At the end of this tour, Cunningham returned to Canada and left the group to his business partner Frank Frost.

=== Final years and death ===
In his final years, Cunningham worked at various fairs in California and Indiana as a ticket seller and cashier at animal shows and fairground attractions. He died in New York in 1907 and was buried in Huntingdon, Canada.

== Reception ==
By people who had met him, R. A. Cunningham was "unanimously regarded in all sources as the prototype of the bad, ruthless human zoo impresario," as a "man hunter" and "freak catcher." He himself claimed to have lured the "Aborigines" onto his ship and then set sail without their consent. The German circus manager and human zoo impresario Carl Hagenbeck said: "This Cunningham is a big scoundrel; you can't trust a guy like that and you shouldn't pay any attention to what he says." The director of the Zoological Garden in Münster, Hermann Landois, described Cunningham in a lengthy newspaper article during the stay of the "Aborigines'" in Münster in August 1885 in these words:

Finally, I cannot refrain from describing in more detail the impresario of the black society, Mr Cunningham. Virchow, Kirchhoff and others — and we have joined them — could not withhold their testimony that the Australian Negroes he presented are among the most interesting ethnographic exhibits. Otherwise, the enterprise can be characterised as the most perfect, crudest form of slave trading. He brought eight individuals with him to America and from there to Europe; within a year, four of them had already died. The savages beg constantly, sell advertising books and photograms day after day, and pocket the money, the value of which they are already quite aware. But soon one after the other will die, and Mr Cunningham will ultimately be the sole surviving laughing heir. The impresario made no secret to me that he had no intention whatsoever of returning the savages to their homeland, but rather of exploiting them to the last breath as victims of his greed for money. Dressed in the garb of an English reverend and with a steel bar covered in rhinoceros skin in his hand, he resembled a slave driver from head to toe. The man subsisted on nothing but coffee, beer, brandy and a few buttered bread rolls a day! Here in our small provincial capital, he raked in 1,459.20 marks in six days, half of which I took from him for the coffers of our zoological garden; his notebook showed daily takings of 500 to 600 marks in other larger cities! Only a pupil of Barnum's could have devised such a thing.

In 2004, Australian anthropologist Roslyn Poignant published her comprehensive study about Cunningham and his three tours of the Aboriginals and Samoans, titled Professional Savages. Captive Lives and Western Spectacles. Her interest in Cunningham's human zoos started after she found a photograph in the 1970s in the Royal Anthropological Institute in London of three indigenous Australians taken in 1885 in Paris. Particularly interested in this photograph, she found out that they were named Billy, Jenny and Toby. During more than two decades of research, Poignant was able to see an extensive scrapbook from the family archive in which he had kept newspaper articles about his shows. Although it cannot be clarified beyond doubt whether Cunningham undertook his journey from California back to Townsville in April 1888 to take the three surviving Aboriginals back to their homeland, Poignant considered this to be very likely. Poignant was also involved in identifying Tambo's story and repatriating his body from Cleveland to Palm Island in Australia in February 1994.

Other works about late 19th-century human zoos have referred to Cunningham and other impresario's ethnic shows as part of common and racist attitudes during the age of Western colonialism.

== Literature ==
- Thode-Arora, Hilke (2022). "The Hagenbeck Ethnic Shows: Recruitment, Organization, and Academic and Popular Responses". In Barabas, Timea; Baraniecka-Olszewska, Kamila; Czarnecka, Dominika; Czarnecka, Dominika; Demski, Dagnosław; Demski, Dagnosław; Kopania, Izabela; Křížová, Markéta; Leskinen, Maria (eds.). Staged Otherness: Ethnic Shows in Central and Eastern Europe, 1850–1939. Budapest New York: Central European University Press. pp. 45–76. ISBN 978-963-386-439-5.
- Poignant, Roslyn (2008). "Billy the Australian in the Anthropological Laboratory". In Blanchard, Pascal; Bancel, Nicolas; Boëtsch, Gilles; Deroo, Éric; Lemaire, Sandrine; Forsdick, Charles (eds.). Human zoos: science and spectacle in the age of colonial empires. Translated by Bridgeman, Teresa. Liverpool: Liverpool University Press. pp. 220–228. ISBN 978-1-84631-174-1.
- Poignant, Roslyn (2004). Professional savages: captive lives and western spectacle. New Haven London: Yale University Press. ISBN 978-0-300-10247-5.
