= Axel Poignant =

English born Swedish photographer

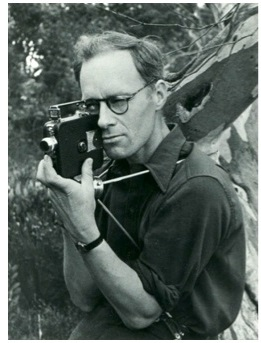
- Self-portrait with first movie camera, Perth, 1933-34
- Born: 12 December 1906; Leeds, England
- Died: 5 February 1986
- Known for: Photography
- Spouse(s): Sandra St Lucien Eliot Chase, 1930–1941 (div.); Ruth Marjorie Pettersen, 1942–1953 (her death); Roslyn Betty Izatt, 1953–1986 (his death)

Axel Poignant (12 December 1906 – 5 February 1986) was an Australian photographer.

== Personal life ==
Poignant was born on 12 December 1906 in Leeds, England, to a Swedish father and an English mother. He had a younger sister. He was educated at Grosvenor House School in Harrogate, Yorkshire, and then moved to Sweden at the end of 1918 where he finished the rest of his education. He returned to England in 1925, then emigrated to Sydney, New South Wales, Australia in July 1926 under the Dreadnought Scheme. He travelled from place to place looking for work throughout Sydney and New South Wales.

Poignant married Sandra St Lucien Eliot Chase on 21 April 1930 and they moved to Perth, Western Australia, where he specialised in portrait photography, personal events as well as aerial photography for Western Mining. Poignant and Sandra divorced in 1941. Poignant became a citizen of Australia on 8 July 1942 in Perth, and married Ruth Marjorie Pettersen the same month. He enlisted in the Australian Imperial Force the following year; he was discharged in 1945.

His second wife died in 1953, and on 24 October 1953 Poignant married Roslyn Betty Izatt, a film technician, in Sydney. He had known her since 1950 and they were both life and photographic partners. In 1956, they moved to England, where Poignant died on 5 February 1986 at his home in Lewisham, London. He had no children.

== Photography ==
After moving to Perth with his first wife in 1930 Poignant gained an interest in photography as a personal career when he invested in a Leica camera in 1933 and specialised in portrait photography through Muriel Chase. Not long afterwards, Poignant and Stuart Gore decided to open a studio together in London where they worked on an aerial photographic survey of the Western Australian goldfields. Photographs of karri logging at Pemberton in 1935, Kalgoorlie mines in 1936, the aerial views of the Duke of Gloucester's arrival in Perth in 1934 and the Anzac Day dawn service in Perth 1939 - all of these images were a fresh view to the public's eye due to Poignant's style and technique, for example his choice of angles. In 1935 Poignant broadened his choice of work from dancing and theatre as he had come in contact with Linley Wilson, a principal of a dance studio as well as a colleague and former student Alison Lee. Once his studio was finally set up, Poignant showcased his photographs and caught the attention of more clients as well as many of the former debutantes of the dance studio. He then moved onto natural history as he became fascinated with the idea of photo-essay and documenting. He had exhibited in Perth in 1941 with Hal Missingham. The following year he took a trip along Canning stock route where he took photographs to review 'marking a change in the portrayal of aborigines'.

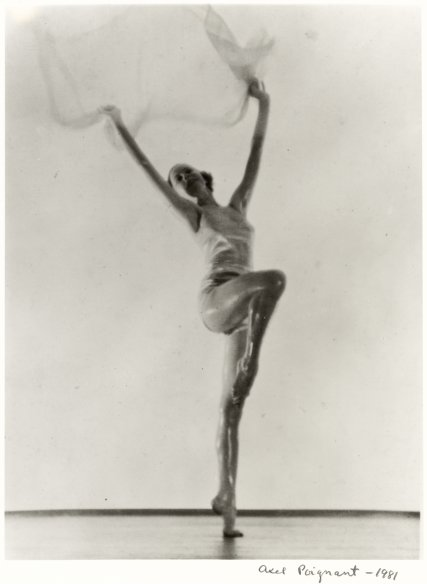
Portrait of Alison Lee, Perth, Western Australia, ca. 1933 Axel Poignant.

Poignant's photographs relate to the traditions of Australian and indigenous identity. A lot of his work captures the flora and fauna of the Outback. He became fascinated with the idea of 'adding real humanity to the medium'. Throughout his travels he fostered strong relationships with Aborigines, continuing to capture portraits of these people and their lifestyles. Poignant used angles as a way of creating his images, for example, shooting from a low point of view and close up to 'appear more natural' than sharp and defined like the earlier ethnographic photography.

== Books ==
Piccaninny Walkabout, published in 1957 won the 1958 Children's Book Council of Australia Picture Book Children's Book of the Year Award. It is the story of two Australian Aboriginal children, Nullagundi and Rikili, who go on a walkabout.

- Kaleku 1972 with Roslyn Poignant
- Children of Oropiro 1976 with Roslyn Poignant

Encounter at Nagalarramba published in 1996 and a joint work with Roslyn Poignant.

== Exhibitions ==
- In September 1941 Poignant and Hal Missingham held an exhibition of fifty photographs each. They gave conversational lectures at the Perth Newspaper House.
- Poignant's Retrospective series 1982 were exhibited in different states displaying photographs he had taken throughout the years 1922 to 1980. The Art Gallery of New South Wales organised his exhibitions.
- 1982 exhibition was held at NSW Art Gallery: This exhibition was taken to different states. 107 photographs were displayed from the years 1922 to 1980.
- 1982 Exhibition held at Art Gallery of Western Australia: AGNSW touring exhibition. Poignant's series of photographs displayed Kalgoorlie, the Canning Stock Route and Central Australia.

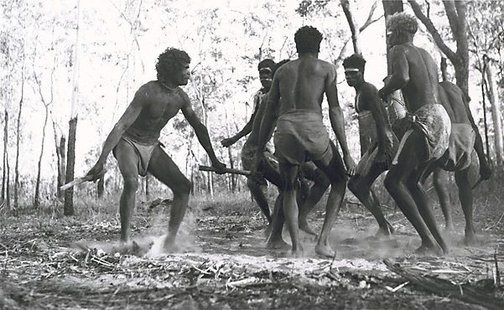
Leading the Dance 1952, Printed 1983. Retrospective Exhibition 1982

- 1983 Exhibition held at National Gallery of Victoria: Solo Survey Exhibition Linkage Project, Tasmanian School of Arts, UTAS.

Photographs, 1922-1980. Sydney: Art Gallery of New South Wales, 1982.

- 1983 Exhibition held at Tasmanian Museum and Art Gallery: This exhibition for Poignant was organised by the NSW Art Gallery (AGNSW). "A major survey of this well known Australian photographer whose reputation was established as a chronicler of Australian life and especially of the Australian Aborigine."
- In 1986 Poignant's work was shown in Aspects of Post Modernism 1929-1942, which was held at the University of Western Australia in 1986.
- After Poignant's death, the National Library of Australia, Canberra, and the art galleries of Western Australia and New South Wales held collections of his work.
- In 2007 the Art Gallery of New South Wales held an exhibition of his work on Indigenous Connections. The Australian National Portrait Gallery also has a number of his works in its collection.
