= Roslyn Poignant =

Australian anthropologist and historian (1927–2019)

- Born: Roslyn Betty Izatt; 12 May 1927; Sydney
- Died: 7 November 2019 (aged 92)
- Education: University of Sydney
- Occupation: photographic anthropologist
- Spouse: Axel Poignant

Roslyn Betty Poignant (12 May 1927 – 7 November 2019) was an Australian photographic anthropologist who collaboratively published, interpreted, and repatriated her husband Axel Poignant's photos of indigenous peoples from Arnhem Land, Papua New Guinea, and Tahiti. Poignant was involved in photographing and writing about museum collections of the material culture of Polynesia, Melanesia, Micronesia, and Australia. Poignant is known for her finding, researching and repatriating an 1885 photograph taken in Paris by anthropological photographer Roland Bonaparte of three Queensland indigenous persons taken to form part of an international touring troupe, for P. T. Barnum's circus. These were people presumed lost to the Manbarra of Palm Island

== Personal life ==
Poignant was born in Marouba (Sydney) in 1927 as Roslyn Betty Izatt. She credited her parents, Miriam (born Audet) and David Izatt, as being responsible for her deep sense of social justice.

Poignant was educated at Sydney Girls High School and then went on take history and anthropology at the University of Sydney. She began studying pictures of indigenous Australians in her first job working with linguist Ted Strehlow who had recorded some of their ceremonies. They were working for the Australian government's film unit and colleagues introduced her to the photographer Axel Poignant. She was to be both his work partner and his third wife. They met in 1950 but they did not marry until 1953 after the death of his second wife. They visited Britain in 1956 and ended up emigrating joining other ex-pats in England.

== Professional achievements ==
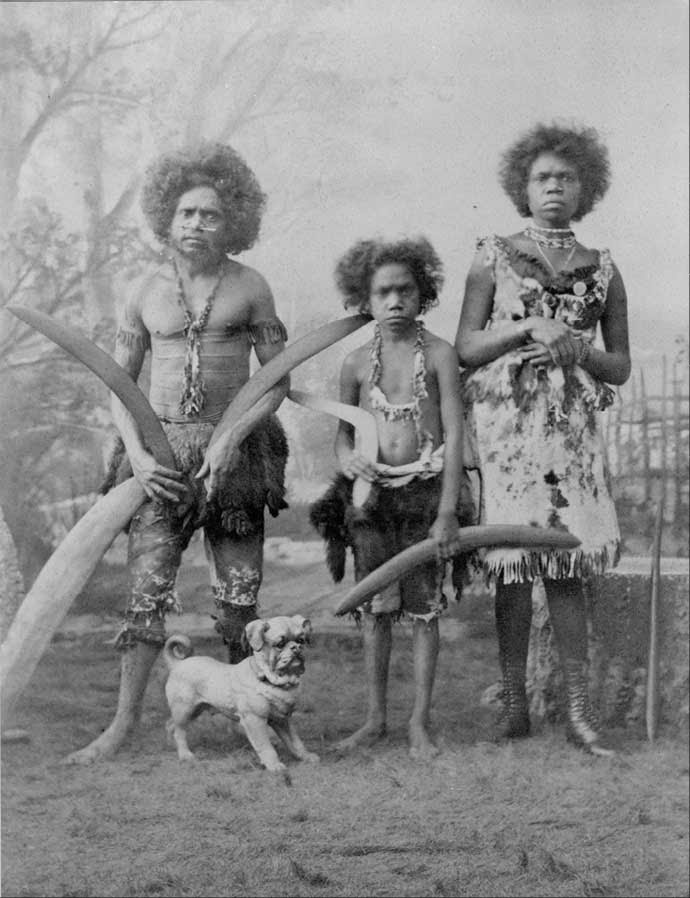
Three Aboriginal Australians from 1885 in Paris by Bonaparte

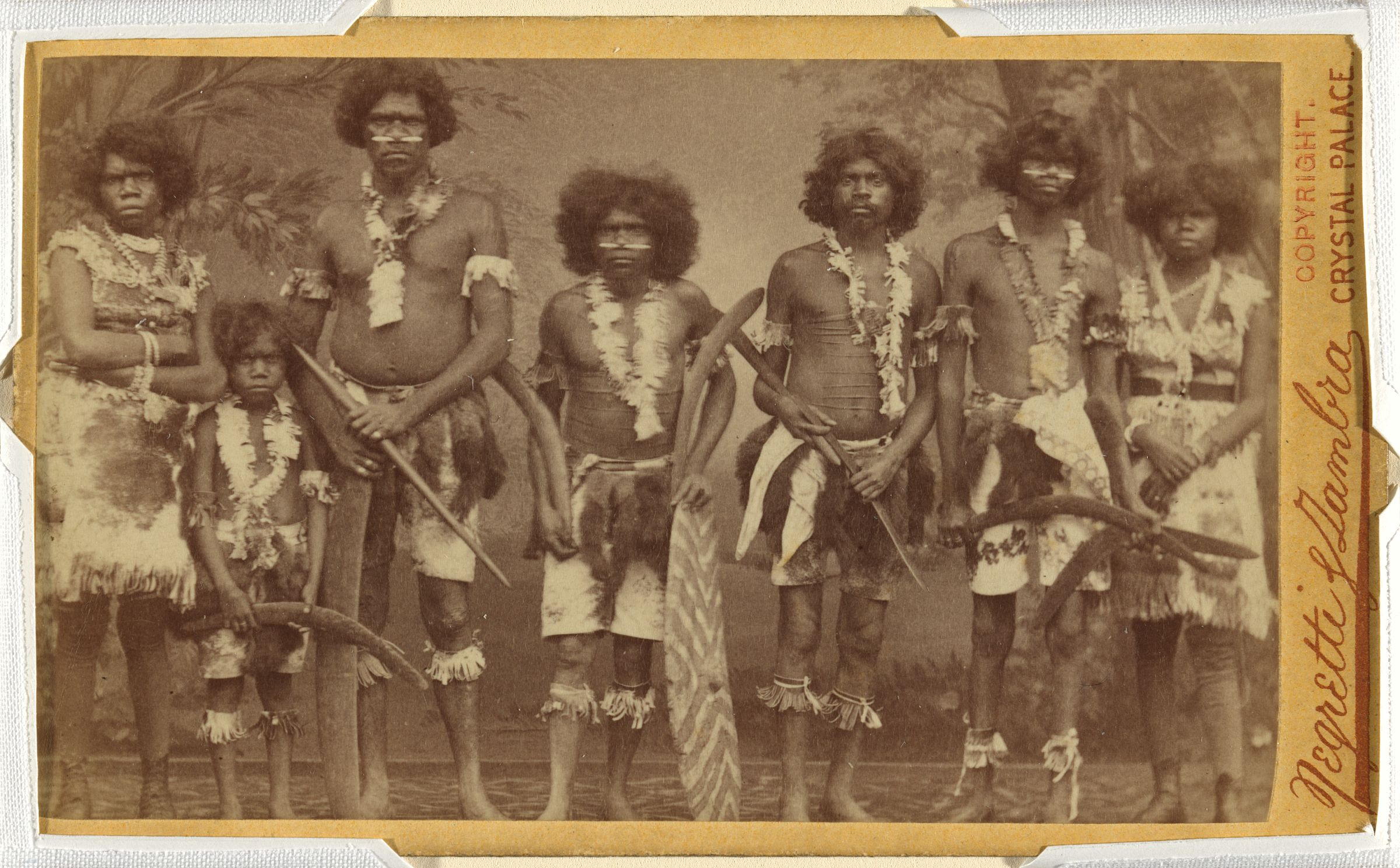
R. A. Cunningham's Australian Aboriginal international touring company, Crystal Palace, London, April 1884

Poignant was known for investigating old photographs after she discovered a photo by the French photographer and investigator Roland Bonaparte. She found photos of indigenous Australians that Bonaparte had taken in 1885 in Paris. She found these in the 1970s in the Royal Anthropological Institute and she was particularly interested in one of Bonaparte's photographs of three Australian aboriginals who she found out were named Billy, Jenny and Toby.

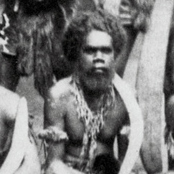
This is believed to be Kukamunburraa

Her investigations found that these were people who had been taken/persuaded to Europe as curiosities. Most died and never returned home to Queensland. They were part of two captures by Robert A. Cunningham who had sent them originally to answer a call by P T Barnum for examples of "uncivilised natives". The people captured were exhibited as "cannibals" in Europe and the US and they were photographed by anthropologists like Bonaparte.

These people were all thought to be dead and buried until the mummified body of Kukamunburra (Tambo) was discovered in a funeral home in Cleveland, Ohio. Tambo's mummified body had been an exhibit in Drew's Dime Museum after his death aged 21 from pneumonia. Poignant was involved in identifying his story and repatriating his body to Palm Island in Australia in February 1994. His story was known to one of his descendants, Walter Palm Island Jnr. These investigations were included in her 2004 book.

== Works include ==
- Oceanic Mythology: The Myths of Polynesia, Micronesia, Melanesia, Australia 1967
- Kaleku 1972 with Axel Poignant
- The Dancing Boy: A Story of the First Australians 1975
- Children of Oropiro 1976 with Axel Poignant
- Discovery Under the Southern Cross 1976
- The First and Last Frontier 1988
- Encounter at Nagalarramba 1996 (with Axel Poignant)
- Professional Savages: Captive Lives and Western Spectacle 2004
