= Solomon Dam =

Dam in Queensland, Australia

- Location of the dam in Queensland
- Interactive map of Solomon Dam
- Country: Australia
- Location: Great Palm Island, Far North Queensland
- Coordinates: 18°43′27″S 146°35′38″E
- Purpose: Potable water supply
- Status: Operational
- Opening date: 1977
- Built by: Cyril Golding Earthmovers
- Operator: Aboriginal Shire of Palm Island

Dam and spillways
- Type of dam: Earth fill dam
- Height (foundation): 17 m (56 ft)
- Length: 405 m (1,329 ft)
- Dam volume: 175×10^{3} m^{3} (6.2×10^{6} cu ft)
- Spillway type: Uncontrolled
- Spillway capacity: 435 m^{3}/s (15,400 cu ft/s)

Reservoir
- Total capacity: 487 megalitres (395 acre⋅ft)
- Catchment area: 4 km^{2} (1.5 sq mi)
- Surface area: 69 ha (170 acres)
- Normal elevation: 16 m (52 ft) AHD

The Solomon Dam is an earth-filled embankment dam located 42 kilometres (26 mi) east of Ingham, in Far North Queensland, Australia. Together with the Francis Creek Dam, the Solomon Dam is a main source of potable water for the Great Palm Island.

== Overview ==
Completed in 1977, the dam is 17 metres (56 ft) high and 408 metres (1,339 ft) long. The resultant 487-megalitre (395 acre⋅ft) reservoir draws from a relatively-small catchment area of 4 square kilometres (1.5 sq mi). The dam is operated by the Aboriginal Shire of Palm Island.

After a sustained drought, in 2016 it was reported that Council was considering replacing the dam with a desalination plant. A $7-million grant for a temporary desalination plant was approved by the Queensland Government in February 2016. Plans for a permanent solar desalination plant were unresolved, as of March 2026.

Scientific studies have claimed that the dam is impacted by cyanobacteria.

== See also ==
- List of dams and reservoirs in Australia
