= London North Mine =

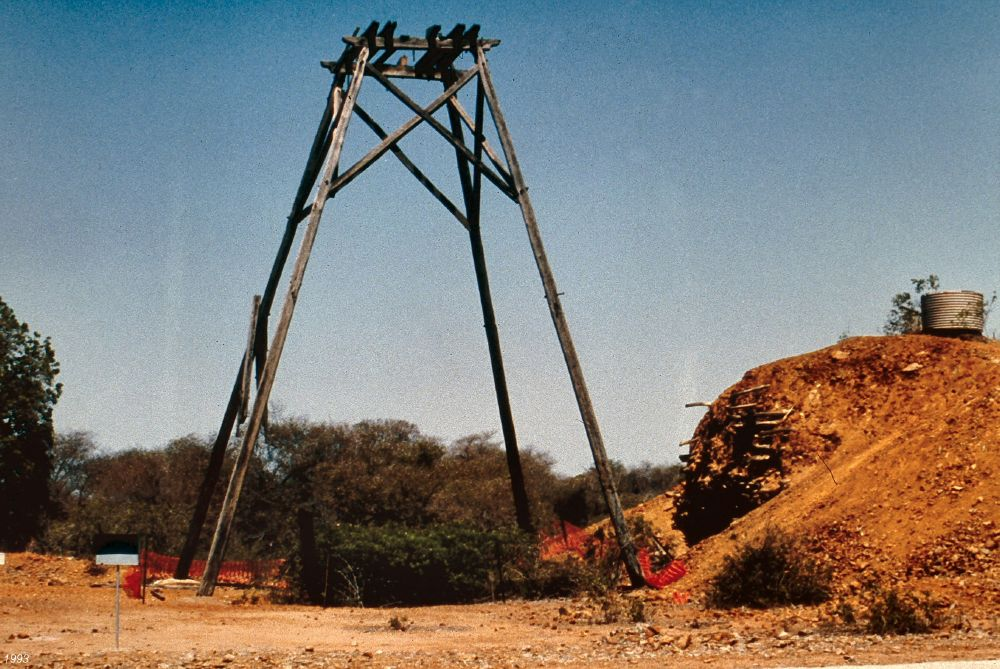
- London North Mine, 1993

- Location within Queensland Location within Australia
- 20.0982°S 146.8869°E
- Location: Elphinstone street, Ravenswood, Charters Towers Region, Queensland, Australia

History
- Design period: 1900–1914 (early 20th century)
- Built: c. 1903–1915

Queensland Heritage Register
- Official name: London North Mine, Ravenswood
- Type: state heritage (built, archaeological)
- Designated: 22 February 1994
- Reference no.: 601207
- Significant period: c. 1903–1915 (fabric); 1903–1915, 1935 (historical)
- Significant components: slab/s – concrete, mullock heap, headframe, shaft

London North Mine is a heritage-listed mine at Elphinstone street, Ravenswood, Charters Towers Region, Queensland, Australia. It was built from c. 1903 to 1915. It was added to the Queensland Heritage Register on 22 February 1994.

== History ==
From the 1850s to the First World War, mining in Queensland was dominated by gold, with major discoveries and consequential "rushes" in such places as Clermont (1861), Gympie (1867), Ravenswood (1868), Charters Towers (1872), Palmer Gold Field (1873), and Mount Morgan (1882). Such discoveries were to make Queensland the third largest producer of gold in Australia, after Western Australia and Victoria.

In the early days, mining at Ravenswood, as with many other gold fields, was restricted to panning the alluvial gold in the gullies of creeks. Later, reef mining was established and it was necessary to set up milling facilities such as the Mabel Mill to extract the gold. The "London" Reef was discovered in the initial development of the Ravenswood Gold Field. An 1872 map shows the London Mining Co lease to include what were later known as the London Mine and the London North Mine.

By 1871, Ravenswood's troubles had begun; as mines sank beneath the water table it was found that the gold could not easily be extracted from the mundic sulphides. In Ravenswood this caused particular problems due in part to the variety and unpredictability of the distribution of sulphides in the ore. Greater capital was now required to fund the various technologies for extracting the gold. As a result, many miners left for other gold fields, such as the recently discovered Charters Towers field, which was to quickly overtake Ravenswood as a gold producer and most important inland North Queensland town.

Despite the exodus, the town continued; with the building of government infrastructure, which included the opening of the Great Northern railway from Townsville in 1884, new Court House and Police Station (1882) new Post and Telegraph Office (1885), and Hospital (1887); and other public buildings such as the School of Arts Library (c. 1876; dem 1992) and Hall (c. 1880); whilst the economy of the town was funded by mining (on a reduced scale) and the establishment of silver mines at nearby Totley.

During the 1890s, profitable mining was undertaken in the town but Ravenswood's second boom was not to occur until the turn of the century when Archibald Laurence Wilson floated the New Ravenswood Co. Funded by substantial British investment, the company acquired numerous mining interests in the town and undertook a major refurbishment introducing new technology to overcome the mundic problem.

In 1903, Ravenswood reached its peak population of some 5,000 people. In the same year, a Charters Towers group headed, according to the Mining Warden, by Thomas Upton, promoted the London North Mine with the intention of working the London Reef. The gold content of the reef was said to increase with depth and a vertical shoot, averaging 200 feet (61 m) in length and from 200–458 feet (61–140 m) in depth, was the first objective. A vertical shaft was sunk in the shoot, a headframe and brace erected over the shaft and a boiler, steam-winding engine and steam-driven pump installed. Underground, the lease was a maze of tunnels and drives covering some fifteen acres but the company had little space above ground with most of the surface near the shaft occupied by domestic buildings. Apparently due to this lack of space, "pigsties" (a particularly Australian method of support more usually employed in the underground shafts) were erected to contain the mullock.

Mechanically-powered shaft-hoisting equipment replaced whips and whims in the larger mines. The rope from a steam winding-engine (generally housed in a simple building nearby) passed over a pulley on top of the headframe and carried a hook on the end to which a cage, bucket, or other item could be attached for raising or lowering in the shaft. The brace provided a platform for handling both mullock and ore, the mullock being trammed to the mullock heap and the ore being tipped into bins for gravity-loading into either tramway trucks or horse- drawn drays.

In 1905, the Warden reported that the mine was covering its own expenses but in subsequent years no great improvement occurred; the heavy water that had confounded their neighbour, the "London" was now evident in the workings of the London North Mine. In 1907, the venture was sold to a local syndicate of Ravenswood investors who placed the mine with a tribute party. In the following years, the venture merged with the "London" and a combined lease was mined, but the results remained marginal. In 1910, the leases were purchased by the New Ravenswood Co; the workings were re-equipped but without any apparent increase in profitability.

By 1912, the mining industry in Ravenswood was in decline. The great strike in Ravenswood of 1912/1913 left a bitterly divided community; the mines continued to decline and the outbreak of war in 1914 lead to an increase in costs and a scarcity of labour. In 1915, the London North Mine was closed. This decline was to be repeated throughout Australia in the post World War I period; with the mining industry not regenerating (albeit in a new form in which coal, aluminium, and iron ore took precedence in the new markets) until after the second World War.

In the following years, mining in the town continued, but the boom was over: much of the population moved away, a number of buildings were removed, and in 1930 Ravenswood became the first Queensland town to lose its railway. A small revival occurred during the 1930s (an attempt was made in 1935 to rework the London North lease, but bad air and heavy expenses in keeping water down led to its abandonment) and early 1940s and later revivals as new technology allowed for economical mining of lower grade ores, but Ravenswood never returned to the prosperity of the early 1900s and was not rebuilt.

Since the 1970s, numerous studies of the Ravenswood area have been completed; in the 1980s the whole town was listed by the Australian Heritage Commission and the National Trust of Queensland. This period also saw the commencement of open cut gold mining by Carpentaria Gold Pty Ltd and the growth of cultural tourism in the town. The London North Mine headframe is one of the last survivors from a period when similar headframes were dominant elements of the Ravenswood townscape.

== Description ==
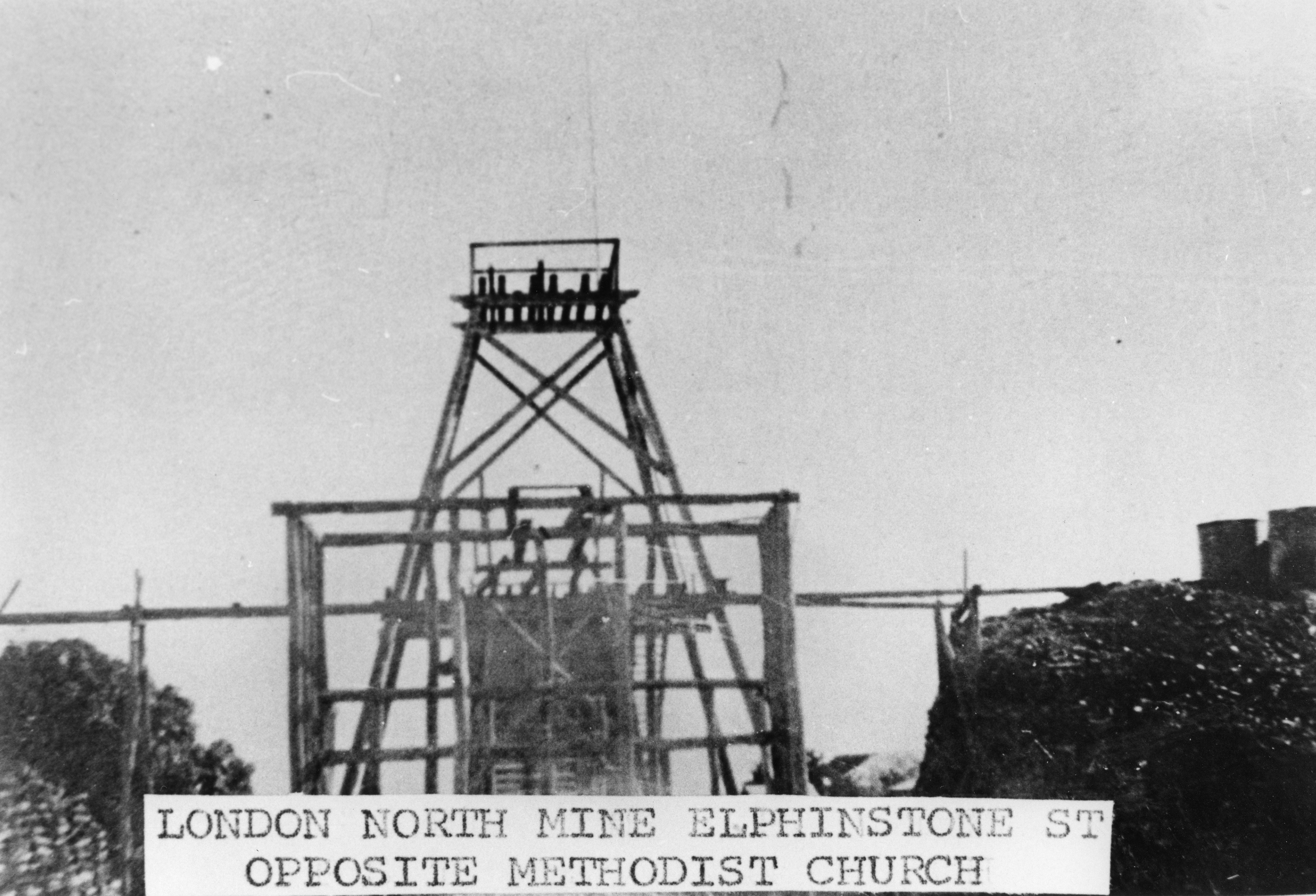
London North Mine

Ravenswood is located in a mining landscape, which consists of disturbed ground with scattered ruins and mullock heaps, set amongst distinctive chinky apples and rubber vines. The remains of the London North Mine, located near the town centre and bounded by Elphinstone Street to the northeast, London Street to the northwest and Macrossan Street to the southeast, consist of a headframe with mullock heaps to the north and south and an engine base to the west.

The headframe, straddling the mine shaft entrance, is a tall hardwood structure consisting of four inwardly-slanting legs connected at their apex by timber beams which once supported a pulley servicing one of the two compartments in the shaft. The structure has cross bracing to each side at the top, with some remains of cross bracing at mid level.

The northern mullock heap is supported by the remains of "pigsties" that were used extensively by miners for support of shafts underground and to shore up larger underground openings. The "pigsty" system provided a frame of timber logs that when packed with mullock could provide considerable structural stability.

The engine foundations, consisting of a concrete slab with its holding down bolts, is all that survives of the boiler house and engines. This is located across a small dry watercourse that possibly was of assistance for de-watering the shaft.

== Heritage listing ==
The London North Mine was listed on the Queensland Heritage Register on 22 February 1994 having satisfied the following criteria.

The place is important in demonstrating the evolution or pattern of Queensland's history.

Ravenswood is one of the earliest sites associated with major gold mining in North Queensland which gave significant impetus to the economic and social development of the region.

The place demonstrates rare, uncommon or endangered aspects of Queensland's cultural heritage.

The headframe is a rare example of a surviving timber headframe in North Queensland.

The place is important in demonstrating the principal characteristics of a particular class of cultural places.

The mine itself, including the headframe, mine shaft, mullock heaps, and engine foundations are a part of the townscape of ruin, which provides a reminder of the often mercurial nature of a community dependent on restricted mineral wealth.

The place has a strong or special association with a particular community or cultural group for social, cultural or spiritual reasons.

Situated overlooking the town, the London North Mine is, as the only surviving headframe in Ravenswood, both a landmark and a symbol of the town.
