= Shop adjacent to Thorps Building =

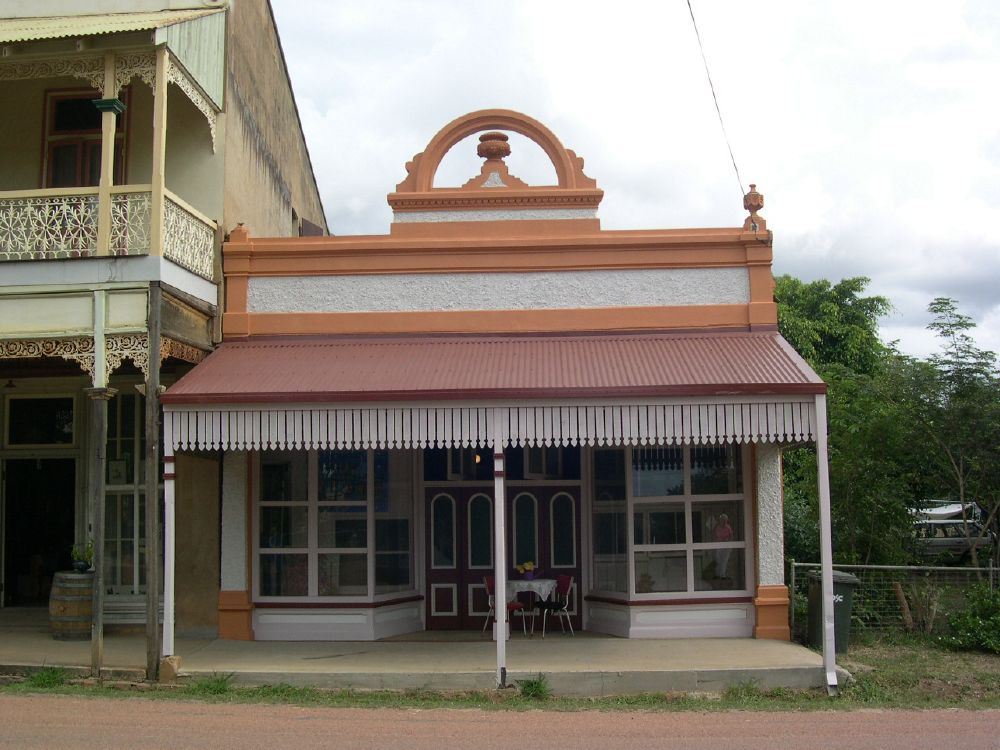
- Shop adjacent to Thorps Building, 2006

- Location within Queensland Location within Australia
- 20.1005°S 146.8894°E
- Location: Macrossan Street, Ravenswood, Charters Towers Region, Queensland, Australia

History
- Design period: 1900–1914 (early 20th century)
- Built: c. 1901

Queensland Heritage Register
- Official name: Shop adjacent to Thorps Building
- Type: state heritage (built)
- Designated: 21 October 1992
- Reference no.: 600454
- Significant period: 1900s (fabric) c. 1901–1980s (historical use)

Shop adjacent to Thorps Building is a heritage-listed shop at Macrossan Street, Ravenswood, Charters Towers Region, Queensland, Australia. It was built c. 1901. It was added to the Queensland Heritage Register on 21 October 1992.

== History ==
The Macrossan Street store is located adjoining Thorps Building and houses two shops in a single storey brick building. It was probably constructed during a building boom in Ravenswood in the early 1900s and has had a variety of commercial tenants including a long occupancy as a bookseller, newsagent and tobacconist.

Ravenswood was one of several important goldfields which formed a major component in the development of North Queensland. The need to access and exploit gold finds determined the path of railways, the establishment of related industries and commerce and the location of settlements. Some of these were short lived "rushes", where tent and shanty townships disappeared almost as quickly as they rose. Other settlements based on goldfields became established towns with government and civic buildings, shops and family homes and survived as such. A few became important centres, only to fade away as gold yields fell. Ravenswood was one of these.

Gold was discovered at Ravenswood in 1868, a few years after pastoral settlement of the area had begun. Ravenswood gold was in reefs and a small battery was first set up in 1869, followed by the Lady Marian Mill in 1870. The settlement was also surveyed at this time, but by then the goldfield itself, and the buildings and streets already established had shaped the town and the survey merely formalised what was already in place. This can still be seen clearly in the irregularity of the major streets. Ravenswood was gazetted as a town in 1871, but problems were soon encountered as the gold at deeper levels proved to be finely distributed in ore containing other minerals and was difficult to separate either by mechanical or chemical means. This required greater capital to fund various technologies for extraction. Many miners left for other fields, such as Charters Towers, discovered in 1871 and which quickly overtook Ravenswood as a gold producer and as the most important inland North Queensland town.

Despite this, Ravenswood continued to prosper due to a steady, though reduced, production of gold, the discovery of silver at nearby Totley in 1878 and as a commercial centre. By 1874, the town had a courthouse and police station, a post and telegraph office, and a school. The stability of the town was also assisted by the arrival of the railway in 1884 and the use of improved means to extract gold from ore. A new generation of public buildings began to replace those from the early days of the field.

The Deed of Grant for the property was issued in 1881 to Phillip Benjamin, who quickly resold it to John Ellis, a bootmaker and saddler. As this was already a commercial area, there may have been an existing store on site or Ellis may have constructed one. In 1896 he became insolvent and the property was purchased by William J McChesney, a telephone line repairer.

In 1899, the New Ravenswood Company was formed by Archibald Laurence Wilson who raised overseas capital, reopened old mines and used modern methods to rework tailings more efficiently. The shareholders recouped their investment in the first two years and this drew world-wide interest. It was the beginning of Ravenswood's most prosperous period, which lasted for several years.

The style and materials of the store suggest that it may have been built during the surge of building that occurred in Ravenswood about this time. Following a fire in 1901, the buildings on the opposite site of the street were rebuilt in brick in a flamboyant style reflecting the prosperity of the goldfield. Thorp's building adjoining the store was constructed soon afterwards. Unfortunately the boom did not last and after 1908 the town began to decline. In 1912 McChesney died and the property was purchased by Raymond W. Richards, a bookseller, newsagent and tobacconist in Ravenswood since 1902. By this time the field was in serious decline because the cost of extraction and continued exploration rose as returns fell and it became apparent that the field would not pick up again. Buildings began to be sold for removal and in 1916 rail services were cut. In 1917 the New Ravenswood Company closed.

In the 1920s most of the timber buildings in Ravenswood were moved away, although brick buildings, such Thorp's Buildings and the store, could not be moved. In 1925 the shop was sold to Phillip Dennis who opened a haberdashery, drapery, tobacconists and newsagency at the address, possibly in two shops.

Ravenswood Shire was absorbed into Dalrymple Shire in 1929 and in 1930 Ravenswood became the first Queensland town to lose its railway connection. Mining had a modest revival in the 1930s, but this had little effect on the life of the town. By the 1960s Ravenswood had reached its lowest ebb with a population of about 70. At this point, tourists began to take a growing interest in the town, studies were made of the buildings and work began to conserve them. In 1978 both Phillip and Jessie Dennis died and the property passed to Gordon Dennis who owned it until 1984, when it was purchased by the current owners.

Although the shop has had a number of commercial tenants since it was built, for a significant part of the time it has served as a newsagent, tobacconist and haberdashery. It is currently vacant.

In the 1980s the whole town was listed by the Australian Heritage Commission and the National Trust of Queensland. In 1987 Carpentaria Gold Ltd opened a new open cut mine using modern heap leaching processes.

== Description ==
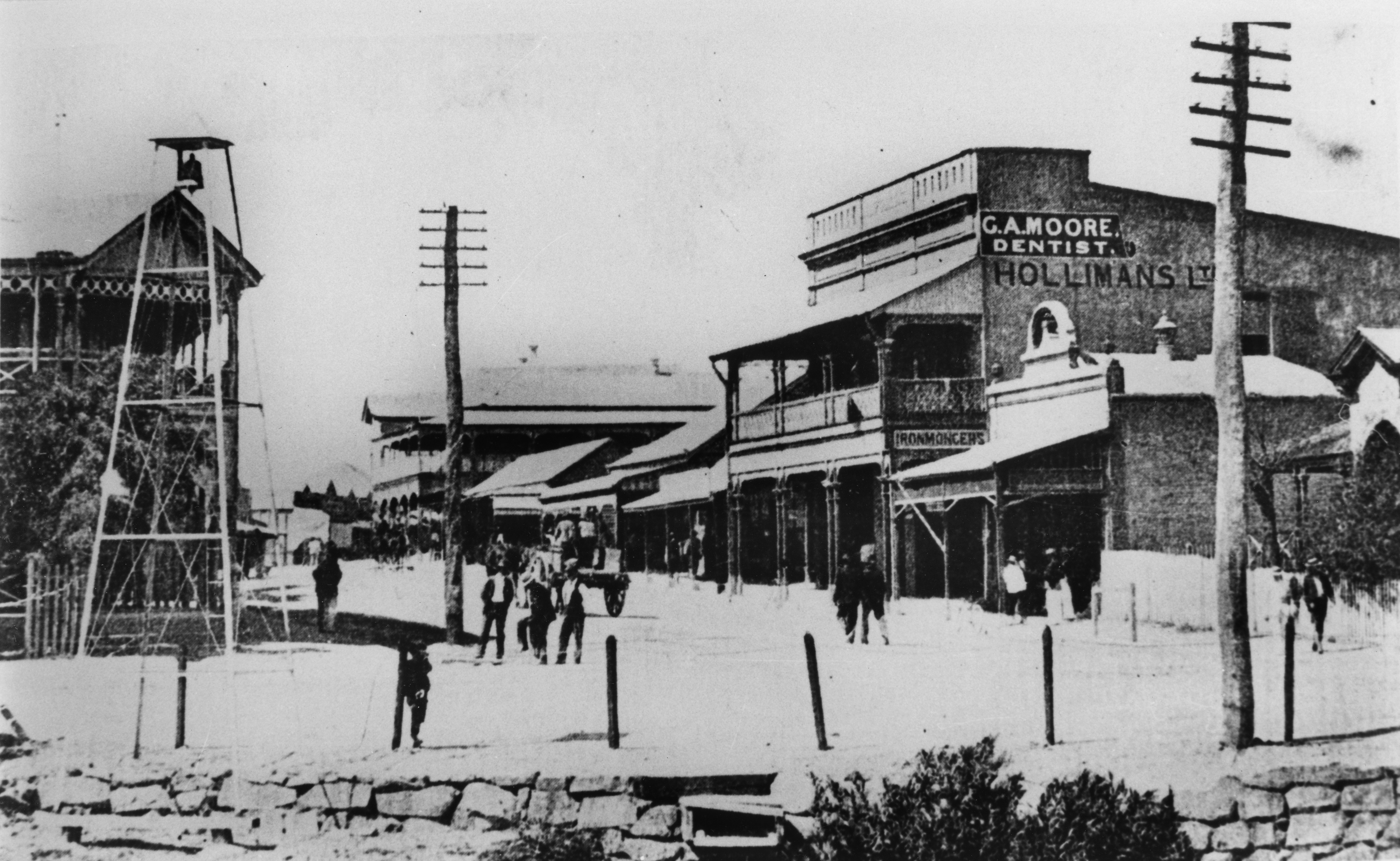
Macrossan street with Thorps Building and adjacent shop (right)

The shop is located adjoining Thorp's Buildings in Macrossan Street close to what was the commercial centre of Ravenswood. This is located in a mining landscape which consists of disturbed ground with scattered ruins and mullock heaps, set amongst distinctive chinkee apple trees and rubber vines.

It is a single storey brick commercial building housing two stores with plate glass display windows and a central entrance with recessed timber doors. It has a pitched roof clad with corrugated iron and concealed by an ornate rendered parapet This has a raised section in the centre topped with an urn within a hollow arch, echoing the central arch motif on the Imperial Hotel and Browne's Buildings opposite. It is flanked by urns at each end of the parapet, although one of these has been lost. An awning supported by plain timber posts shades footpath at the front of the store and is decorated by a sawn timber valance. Most detail is intact.

== Heritage listing ==
The shop adjacent to Thorps Building was listed on the Queensland Heritage Register on 21 October 1992 having satisfied the following criteria.

The place is important in demonstrating the evolution or pattern of Queensland's history.

Ravenswood is one of the earliest sites associated with major gold mining in North Queensland which gave significant impetus to the economic and social development of the region. The Macrossan Street shop, as a substantial commercial building serving the needs of a prosperous mining community, demonstrates this development.

The place is important in demonstrating the principal characteristics of a particular class of cultural places.

The shop is one of only two substantial retail stores from a commercial centre which, in the early 1900s, featured a line of handsome and fashionable buildings on both sides of southern Macrossan street. In its form, layout and decoration it is a good example of a quality commercial building of its era.

The place is important because of its aesthetic significance.

With Thorp's building it forms an attractive group which is an important and dominant feature of the Ravenswood townscape.
