= Cake Shop, Ravenswood =

Shop in Queensland, Australia

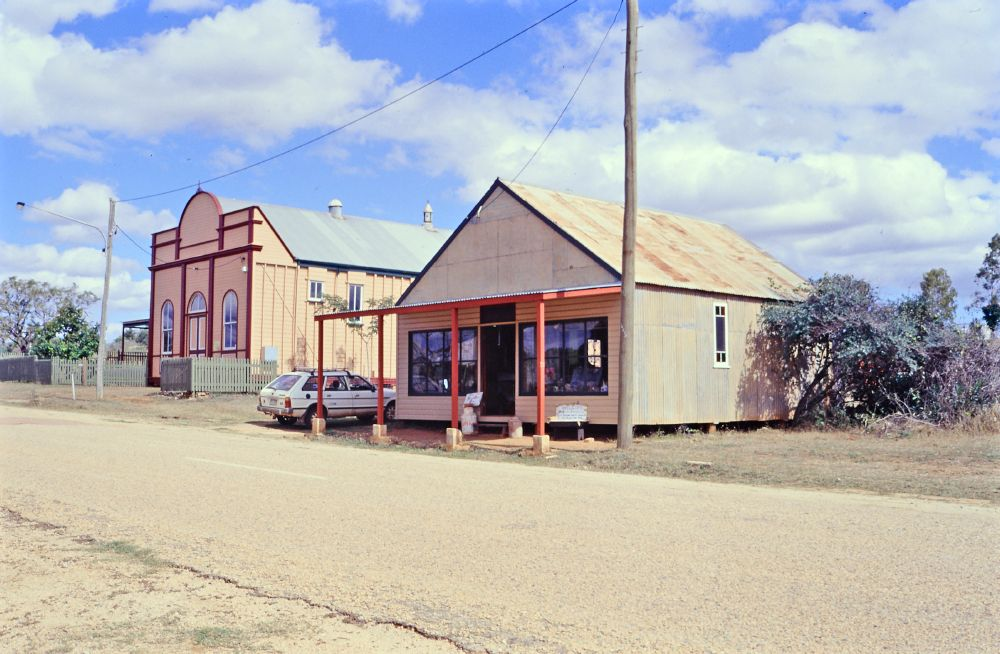
- Cake Shop, 1997

- Location within Queensland Location within Australia
- 20.1013°S 146.89°E
- Location: Macrossan Street, Ravenswood, Charters Towers Region, Queensland, Australia

History
- Design period: 1870s–1890s (late 19th century)
- Built: 1880s

Queensland Heritage Register
- Official name: Cake Shop, Ravenswood, Jun Yeung Wong and Company, The Pie Shop
- Type: state heritage (built)
- Designated: 21 October 1992
- Reference no.: 600449
- Significant period: 1880s (fabric); 1880s–1947, 1990s–ongoing (historical use)

Cake Shop is a heritage-listed shop at Macrossan Street, Ravenswood, Charters Towers Region, Queensland, Australia. It was built in the 1880s. It is also known as Jun Yeung Wong & Company and The Pie Shop. It was added to the Queensland Heritage Register on 21 October 1992.

== History ==
The Cake Shop is located on the western side of Macrossan Street near the School of Arts. It is thought to have been built in the 1880s and may have been first used by Jun Yeung Wong and Company as a store and an outlet for garden produce. It has had a variety of tenants over the years and is best remembered by people in the district as a cake or pie shop.

Ravenswood was one of several important goldfields which formed a major component in the development of North Queensland. The need to access and exploit gold finds determined the path of railways, the establishment of related industries and commerce and the location of settlements. Some of these were short lived "rushes", where tent and shanty townships disappeared almost as quickly as they rose. Other settlements based on goldfields became established towns with government and civic buildings, shops and family homes and survived as such. A few became important centres, only to fade away as gold yields fell. Ravenswood was one of these.

Gold was discovered at Ravenswood in 1868, a few years after pastoral settlement of the area had begun. Ravenswood gold was in reefs and a small battery was first set up in 1869, followed by the Lady Marian Mill in 1870. The settlement was also surveyed at this time, but by then the goldfield itself, and the buildings and streets already established had shaped the town and the survey merely formalised what was already in place. This can still be seen clearly in the irregularity of the major streets. Ravenswood was gazetted as a town in 1871, but problems were soon encountered as the gold at deeper levels proved to be finely distributed in ore containing other minerals and was difficult to separate either by mechanical or chemical means. This required greater capital to fund various technologies for extraction. Many miners left for other fields, such as Charters Towers, discovered in 1871 and which quickly overtook Ravenswood as a gold producer and as the most important inland North Queensland town.

Despite this, Ravenswood continued to prosper due to a steady, though reduced, production of gold, the discovery of silver at nearby Totley in 1878 and as a commercial centre. By 1874, the town had a courthouse and police station, a post and telegraph office, and a school. The stability of the town was also assisted by the arrival of the railway in 1884 and the use of improved means to extract gold from ore. A new generation of public buildings began to replace those from the early days of the field.

In 1882 the land on which the shop stands was subdivided from the block granted to Ebenezer Roberts the previous year and was purchased by Frederick Wise. Wise kept a store and was Vice President of the School of Arts. An early resident of Ravenswood remembered the store as having been used by the Chinese as a general store, produce outlet and a gold exchange during the "rush" years, although this may have simply taken the form of accepting payment for goods in gold. The name Jun Yeung Wong and Company was faintly visible on the front of the store until the 1960s, although it is not recorded in post office directories. Ravenswood had a significant minority of Chinese amongst its population in the nineteenth century, although, as with other goldfields, there is now little evidence of their presence.

In 1904 the property was acquired by Daniel Patience, apparently as an investment, but run by a Mrs Watson as a cordial shop and manufactory as an adjunct to James Watson's aerated waters factory until 1918. By this time Ravenswood was in serious decline, after having enjoyed a boom between 1900 and 1908 due to more modern techniques being applied to ore processing. However, the cost of extraction and continued exploration rose as returns fell and after the end of the war it became apparent that it would not pick up again. In 1918 the shop was sold to the Kluver family. Herbert Kluver was a carrier and his wife ran the shop as refreshment rooms. In the 1920s, buildings as well as people left Ravenswood, as timber buildings were relocated in other towns.

In 1924 the shop was bought by Ethel Wadsworth who ran refreshment rooms throughout the small revival of the 1930s and early 1940s as new technology allowed for economical mining of lower grade ores, but closed in 1947. It was grandly called a restaurant in its closing years but seems to have been actually a cake and pie shop that provided table service for customers. This is the use best remembered by local people. It may have been empty for a while before being sold to Gertrude Blackman in 1952. Its use during that time is not known but by then there were very few businesses in town and its use as a residence is remembered locally. It was purchased by the owners of Ravenswood station in 1966 and was used at one time to store fodder. During this period the population of Ravenswood fell to 70. This was to be its lowest level, because tourists began to take an interest in the town, studies were made of the buildings and work began to conserve them. In the 1980s the whole town was listed by the Australian Heritage Commission and the National Trust of Queensland. In 1987 Carpentaria Gold Ltd opened a new open cut mine using modern heap leaching processes.

The present owner purchased the cake shop in 1986, but in 1989 it was severely damaged by two cyclones. A grant from the Queensland Department of Environment and Heritage in 1991, together with assistance from the Dalrymple Shire Council, allowed the store to be repaired and the store front to be reconstructed reusing original materials where possible. In 1993 the rear of the shop and an attached residence were demolished.

A gift, craft and cake shop was opened in the building after renovations.

== Description ==
The Cake Shop is located on the western side of Macrossan Street near to the School of Arts and within the town centre of Ravenswood. The town is located in a mining landscape, which consists of disturbed ground scattered with ruins and mullock heaps, set amongst distinctive chinkee apples and rubber vines.

The shop is a modest single storey, timber-framed building set on low stumps. It is rectangular in plan and with its long axis at right angles to the street. The gabled roof and outside walls are sheeted with corrugated galvanised iron. The shopfront is clad with sawn boards and shaded by a corrugated iron skillion awning supported by plain timber posts over the footpath. Above the awning the gable is clad with sheet metal panels. The central front entrance is flanked by large shop windows with display alcoves behind. The interior has a timber floor and is largely unlined.

== Heritage listing ==
The Cake Shop in Ravenswood was listed on the Queensland Heritage Register on 21 October 1992 having satisfied the following criteria.

The place is important in demonstrating the evolution or pattern of Queensland's history.

Ravenswood is one of the earliest sites associated with major gold mining in North Queensland which gave significant impetus to the economic and social development of the region. The Cake Shop reflects this economic and social development through its role as a commercial building in the centre of the Ravenswood business district.

The place demonstrates rare, uncommon or endangered aspects of Queensland's cultural heritage.

Although as a modest timber and iron commercial building it is now a rarity in Ravenswood, it is important as a representative example of a type of building once common in the town and as such provides some perspective for the other remaining buildings, such as the hotels, which are far more grand.

The place is important because of its aesthetic significance.

As one of a handful of buildings remaining from the peak years of Ravenswood, set amongst a mining landscape of mullock heaps, abandoned mines and equipment, the shop makes an important visual contribution to the town.
