= Pandanus Creek Battery =

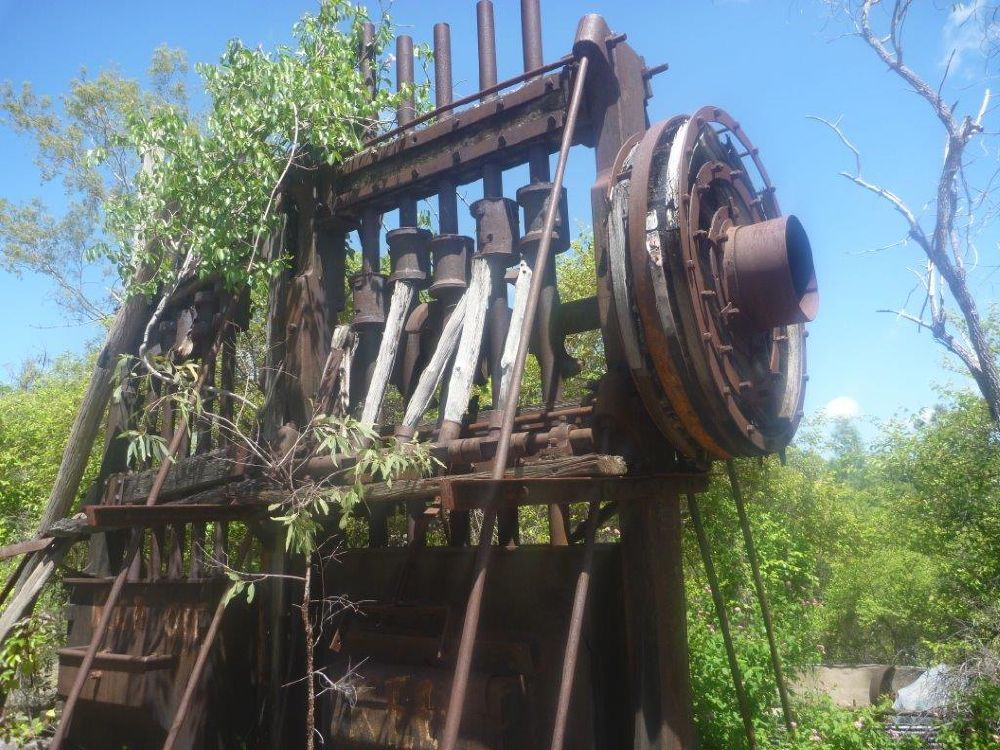
- Pandanus Creek Battery, 2014

- Location within Queensland Location within Australia
- 20.0703°S 146.639°E
- Location: Via Ravenswood to Mingela Road, Ravenswood, Charters Towers Region, Queensland, Australia

History
- Design period: 1900–1914 (early 20th century)
- Built: 1904

Queensland Heritage Register
- Official name: Pandanus Creek Battery, Breitkreuz's Mill
- Type: state heritage (built, archaeological)
- Designated: 5 April 2004
- Reference no.: 601848
- Significant period: 1890, 1904 (fabric); 1904–c. 1916 (historical)
- Significant components: chimney/chimney stack, battery/crusher/stamper/jaw breaker, machinery/plant/equipment – mining/mineral processing, settling tank / pond

Pandanus Creek Battery is a heritage-listed stamper battery on Mingela Road, Ravenswood, Charters Towers Region, Queensland, Australia. It was built in 1904. It is also known as Breitkreuz's Mill. It was added to the Queensland Heritage Register on 5 April 2004.

== History ==
The Pandanus Creek battery was relocated by C. Breitkreutz from Rochford (20°06′00″S 146°37′00″E) in 1904 where it had been known as the Hadleigh Castle Mill. It had been erected in 1890. The 1890s were the heyday of mining in the district. It is not known when the battery ceased operations, but Breitkreutz owned the Three Sisters and Sisters Extended Mines on the Kirk River to the east and they were working between 1900 and 1916.

== Description ==
Compact and partly intact battery situated on the eastern bank of Pandanus Creek immediately north of a recent re-treatment plant, which is currently mothballed. The battery comprises two almost intact 5 headsets of stamps in iron frames. One mortar box is manufacture by Walkers Limited, the other by Brand and Drybrough. Alongside immediately to the north of the battery is a Ruston one cylinder gas engine. The treatment area below the battery contains the remains of a Wilfley table and five berdan pans including three in situ. Three 5-metre (16 ft) diameter corrugated iron tanks are also located in this area. The brick chimney has received substantial damage to its northwest base possibly during removal of the boiler. Other features of the site include a stone launder from the mill area to the creek and the remains of a stone forge. Battery shed timber uprights remain in situ.

Surviving plant includes:

- 5 head battery and frame – (mortar box) Walkers Limited
- Five head battery & frame – (mortar box) Brand & Drybrough Townsville: (stamper frame) Brand & Drybrough Engineers Townsville
- One cylinder gas engine with flywheel – Ruston Lincoln England
- 5 Berdan Pans (3 in situ)
- Wilfley table (fragments).

== Heritage listing ==
Pandanus Creek Battery was listed on the Queensland Heritage Register on 5 April 2004 having satisfied the following criteria.

The place is important in demonstrating the evolution or pattern of Queensland's history.

The Pandanus Creek battery is important in demonstrating the evolution of gold mining practices in north Queensland during the late 19th and early 20th centuries. The place is also significant for its association with the enterprising Mr C. Breitkreutz of Rochford, where the battery had originally been part of the Hadleigh Castle mill.

The place demonstrates rare, uncommon or endangered aspects of Queensland's cultural heritage.

The battery is significant as one of very few surviving intact isolated stamp batteries in the Charters Towers Mining District.

The place is important in demonstrating the principal characteristics of a particular class of cultural places.

The technology of processing ore at the site is demonstrated through the association of the battery with a brick chimney, gas engine and a concentrating treatment plant below the battery, which includes berdan pans.
