= Ravenswood, Queensland =

Ravenswood
- Town
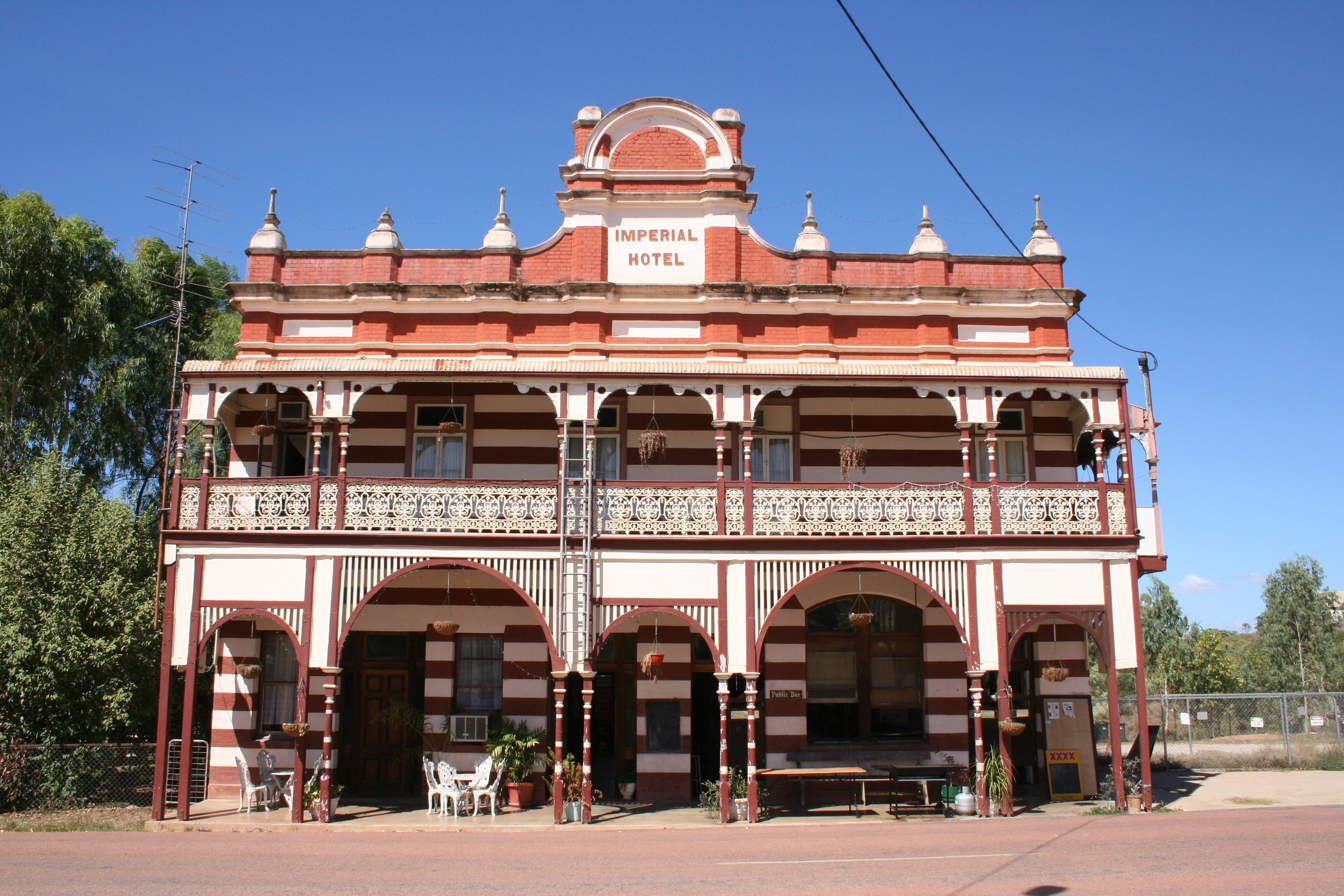
- Imperial Hotel at Ravenswood

- Interactive map of Ravenswood
- Coordinates: 20.0963°S 146.8888°E
- Country: Australia
- State: Queensland
- LGA: Charters Towers Region
- Location: 88.6 km (55.1 mi) E of Charters Towers; 130 km (81 mi) S of Townsville; 1,329 km (826 mi) NNW of Brisbane

Government
  - State electorate: Traeger
  - Federal division: Kennedy

Area
  - Total: 3,020.8 km^{2} (1,166.3 sq mi)

Population
  - Total: 297 (2021 census)
  - Density: 0.09832/km^{2} (0.2546/sq mi)
- Time zone: UTC+10:00 (AEST)
- Postcode: 4816
Localities around Ravenswood
Dotswood	Mingela	Reid River; Upper Haughton
Broughton	Ravenswood	Mulgrave; Swans Lagoon
Seventy Mile	Mount Wyatt	Eight Mile Creek

Ravenswood is a rural town and locality in the Charters Towers Region, Queensland, Australia. It is historically and currently a gold mining town. In the 2021 census, the locality of Ravenswood had a population of 297 people.

== Geography ==
The Flinders Highway loosely bounds parts of the north-western boundary of the locality, entering from the north-east (Reid River) and exiting to the west (Broughton). The Great Northern railway line takes a similar route to the highway mostly immediately parallel to the highway to the north or the south, with the following stations:

- Cardington railway station, now abandoned (19.8190°S 146.7914°E)
- Woldston railway station(19.8318°S 146.7611°E)
- Fanning railway station, now abandoned (19.9156°S 146.5636°E)

There are a number of neighbourhoods within the locality:

- Boori (20.0166°S 146.7666°E)
- Cardington (19.8333°S 146.7833°E)
- Kirk (20.0666°S 146.6833°E)
- Rochford (20.1°S 146.6166°E)
- Silver Valley (20.0666°S 146.6833°E)
- Waigera (20.0333°S 146.7833°E)
- Woldston (19.8333°S 146.7666°E)

== History ==
After the discovery of gold in 1868 through to the early 1900s, the township flourished and grew to nearly 5000 residents and boasted 48 hotels. Several historic buildings remain from this period. Due to an industrial strike in 1912 and subsequently World War I, by 1915 mining declined and the town was deserted.

Silver was discovered in the area in 1870 by W. Stable.

Ravenswood State School opened on 27 October 1873.

From 1879 to 1930, Ravenswood was the administrative centre for local government, initially of Ravenswood Division (1879–1903) and later of the Shire of Ravenswood (1903–1930). However, with the decline in Ravenwood's population it was no longer financially viable to have a separate local government authority, and the Shire of Ravenswood was absorbed into the Shire of Dalrymple.

Ravenswood Convent School opened in 1885 in association with St Patrick's Catholic Church. It closed in 1948.

Sandy Creek Provisional School opened on 26 June 1885. In 1886 it was renamed Evlinton Provisional School. On 1 January 1909 it became Evlington State School. It closed in 1921.

Kirk River Provisional School opened on 1 October 1890. On 1 June 1929 it became Kirk River State School, but then closed on 8 May 1930. In 1934 it reopened as Kirk River Provisional School. It closed in 1944.

Kirk Diggings Provisional School opened in 1903 but closed and reopened a number of times before finally closing circa 1918.

Pandanus Creek Provisional School opened in 1909, becoming Pandanus Creek State School on 1 May 1909. It closed in 1926.

On April 18, 1941, two RAF personal were killed when their aircraft crashed near Ravenswood.

In August 2017, an early cemetery in Ravenswood was found by contractors using ground penetrating radar while working on Carpentaria Gold's Ravenswood Expansion Project. The 16 graves of 9 adults and 7 children were found behind the Ravenswood State School sports oval; the burials are thought to have occurred in the late 1860s and early 1870s. Forensic archeologists will attempt to obtain DNA from the remains.

In 2019, an expansion of gold mining required the school and its heritage buildings to be relocated to a new site at 30-40 Elphinstone Street.

A major expansion to the local gold mining industry was announced in 2020.

== Demographics ==
In the 2006 census, the town of Ravenswood had a population of 191 people.

In the 2011 census, the locality of Ravenswood had a population of 349 people.

In the 2016 census, the locality of Ravenswood had a population of 255 people.

In the 2021 census, the locality of Ravenswood had a population of 297 people.

== Heritage listings ==
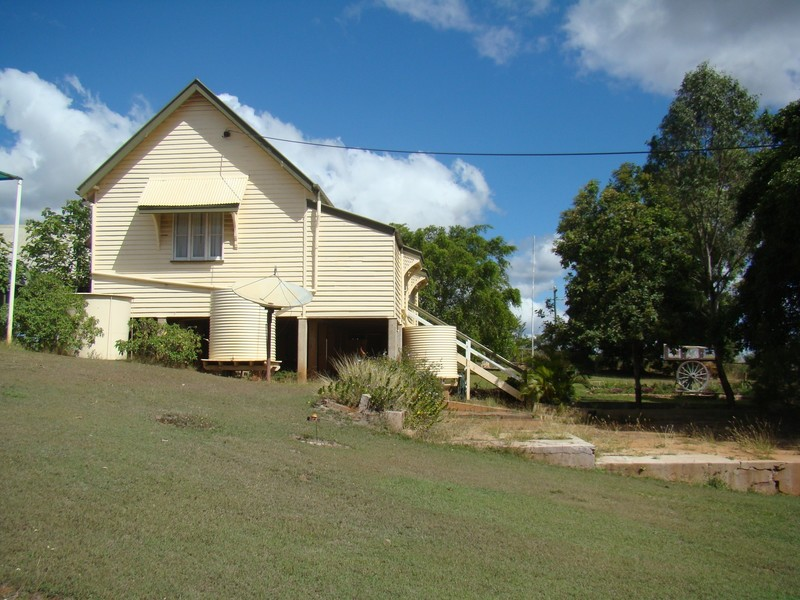
Ravenswood State School in School Street, 2008

Ravenswood has a number of heritage-listed sites, including:

- Mabel Mill, Barton Street
- Railway Hotel, Barton Street
- Ravenswood Community Church, Chapel Street
- Chapel Street Bridge, Chapel Street (20.0988°S 146.8944°E)
- Ravenswood Ambulance Station, Deighton Street
- London North Mine, Elphinstone Street
- Cake Shop, Macrossan Street
- Imperial Hotel, Macrossan Street
- Ravenswood Post Office, Macrossan Street
- School of Arts, Macrossan Street
- Shop adjacent to Thorps Building, Macrossan Street
- Thorps Building, Macrossan Street
- Ravenswood Court House and Police Station, Raven Street
- Ravenswood School and Residence, originally in School Street, but relocated circa 2019 to 30–40 Elphinstone Street
- Totley Township, Totley (2 kilometres (1.2 mi) from Ravenswood)
- Pandanus Creek Battery, via Ravenswood to Mingela Road
- Ravenswood Mining Landscape and Chinese Settlement Area, reserve bounded by School Street, Cemetery Road, Railway Street and Burdekin Falls Dam Road

== Economy ==
Two gold mines are in operation in the area; a large open cast pit behind the town and an underground one at nearby Mount Wright. With the resurgence of mining in recent years, the population has grown from 200 to nearly 500. Tourism is also important.

== Education ==
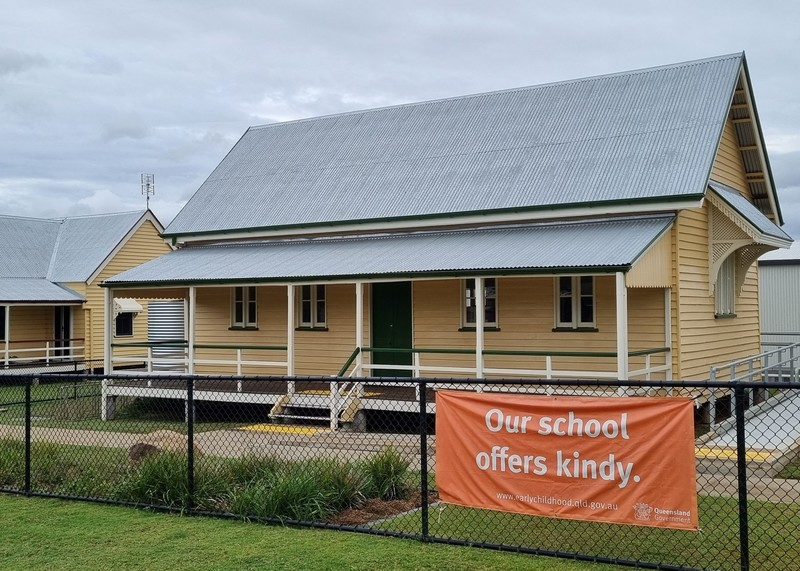
Ravenswood School on new site in Elphinstone Street, 2022

Ravenswood State School is a government primary (Early Childhood to Year 6) school for boys and girls 30–40 Elphinstone Street (20.0966°S 146.8870°E). In 2018, the school had an enrolment of 23 students with 3 teachers (2 full-time equivalent) and 6 non-teaching staff (3 full-time equivalent).

There is no secondary school in Ravenswood. The nearest government secondary school is Charters Towers State High School in Charters Towers to the west.

Due to the extensive size of this locality, the distances involved to travel to either or both of these schools may make it impossible to attend. Distance education and boarding schools are the alternatives.

== Amenities ==
Facilities in the town include a combined general store and post office, a primary school and two pubs, the Railway and the Imperial. Fuel can be obtained from both Top Camp near the entrance to the town and the post office. Top Camp also offers meals and bungalow style accommodation.

== Notable residents ==
- John Archibald, police magistrate and mining warden at Ravenswood.
- Louis Becke, writer, in 1877 worked at Ravenswood (pastoral) Station, 30 miles from the town.
- John Deane, miner, pastoralist and politician.
- William Hodgkinson, gold miner, journalist and politician.
- John Macrossan, miner and politician.
- Sir John Lawrance McKelvey, surgeon, was born in Ravenswood.
- John Mathew, gold miner, clergyman and anthropologist.
- Hugh Mosman, mine owner and politician.
- Edmund Plant, mine owner and politician.
- Gilbert White, bishop and writer.

== Cultural references ==
The artist Sali Herman won the Wynne Prize in 1967 for his painting Ravenswood I.

== See also ==
- List of tramways in Queensland
