= Thorps Building =

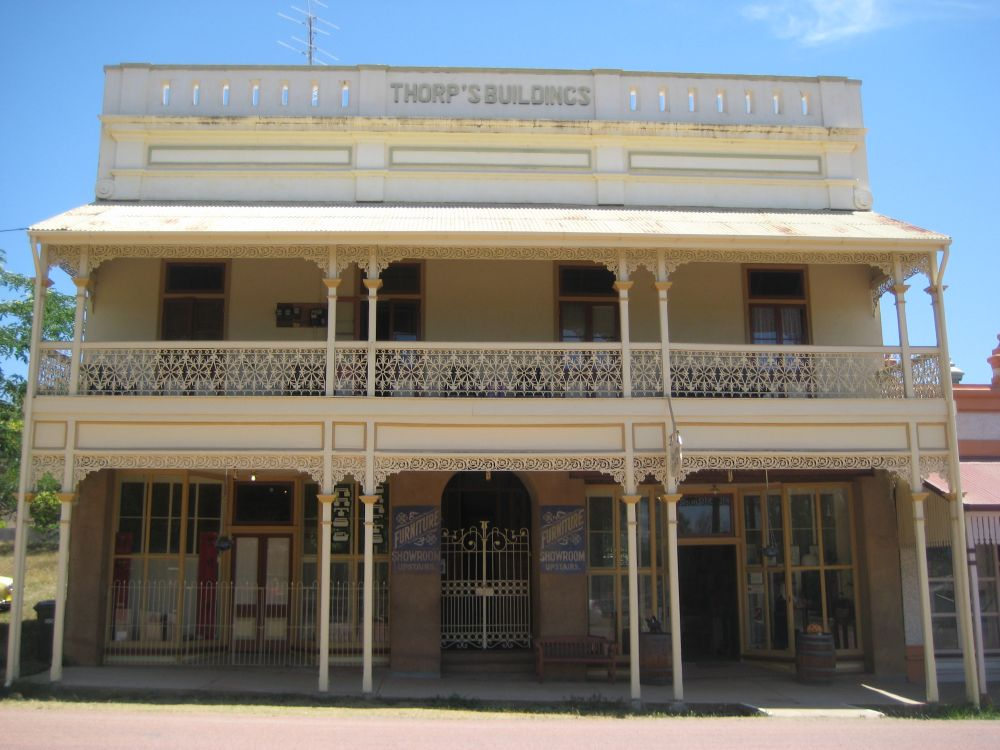
- Thorps Building, 2008

- Location within Queensland Location within Australia
- 20.1006°S 146.8894°E
- Location: Macrossan Street, Ravenswood, Charters Towers Region, Queensland, Australia

History
- Design period: 1900–1914 (early 20th century)
- Built: c. 1903

Site notes
- Architectural style: Federation Filigree

Queensland Heritage Register
- Official name: Thorps Building, Burns & Fritz Hardware, Hollimans Limited, Thorp's Goldfield Tearooms
- Type: state heritage (built)
- Designated: 21 October 1992
- Reference no.: 600452
- Significant period: 1900s (fabric) c. 1903–1970s, 1980s–ongoing (historical use)
- Significant components: gate – entrance, furniture/fittings

Thorps Building is a heritage-listed commercial building at Macrossan Street, Ravenswood, Charters Towers Region, Queensland, Australia. It was built c. 1903. It is also known as Burns & Fritz Hardware, Hollimans Limited, and Thorp's Goldfield Tearooms. It was added to the Queensland Heritage Register on 21 October 1992.

== History ==
Thorp's Buildings was constructed about 1903 for Sydney Hood Thorp, a mining agent and sharebroker who had a substantial business interest in both the Ravenswood and Charters Towers goldfields. It housed businesses which supplied miners with everything from household goods to mining machinery and is the only two storey shop still standing in Ravenswood.

Ravenswood was one of several important goldfields which formed a major component in the development of North Queensland. The need to access and exploit gold finds determined the path of railways, the establishment of related industries and commerce and the location of settlements. Some of these were short lived "rushes", where tent and shanty townships disappeared almost as quickly as they rose. Other settlements based on goldfields became established towns with government and civic buildings, shops and family homes and survived as such. A few became important centres, only to fade away as gold yields fell. Ravenswood was one of these.

Gold was discovered at Ravenswood in 1868, a few years after pastoral settlement of the area had begun. Ravenswood gold was in reefs and a small battery was first set up in 1869, followed by the Lady Marian Mill in 1870. The settlement was also surveyed at this time, but by then the goldfield itself, and the buildings and streets already established had shaped the town and the survey merely formalised what was already in place. This can still be seen clearly in the irregularity of the major streets. Ravenswood was gazetted as a town in 1871, but problems were soon encountered as the gold at deeper levels proved to be finely distributed in ore containing other minerals and was difficult to separate either by mechanical or chemical means. This required greater capital to fund various technologies for extraction. Many miners left for other fields, such as Charters Towers, discovered in 1871 and which quickly overtook Ravenswood as a gold producer and as the most important inland North Queensland town.

Despite this, Ravenswood continued to prosper due to a steady, though reduced, production of gold, the discovery of silver at nearby Totley in 1878 and as a commercial centre. By 1874, the town had a courthouse and police station, a post and telegraph office, and a school. The stability of the town was also assisted by the arrival of the railway in 1884 and the use of improved means to extract gold from ore. A new generation of public buildings began to replace those from the early days of the field.

The land on which Thorp's Buildings stands was purchased in 1881 by Ah Pong, although the first person recorded as trading from the site was Martin Braby who acquired the property in 1885. Initially a draper, he went on to become a commission and insurance agent also. In 1894 the property was purchased by Robert Stewart and James Clark and was probably leased out by them as commercial premises.

In 1899, the New Ravenswood Company was formed by Archibald Laurence Wilson who raised overseas capital, reopened old mines and used modern methods to rework tailings more efficiently. The shareholders recouped their investment in the first two years and this drew world-wide interest. It was the beginning of Ravenswood's most prosperous period, which lasted for several years.

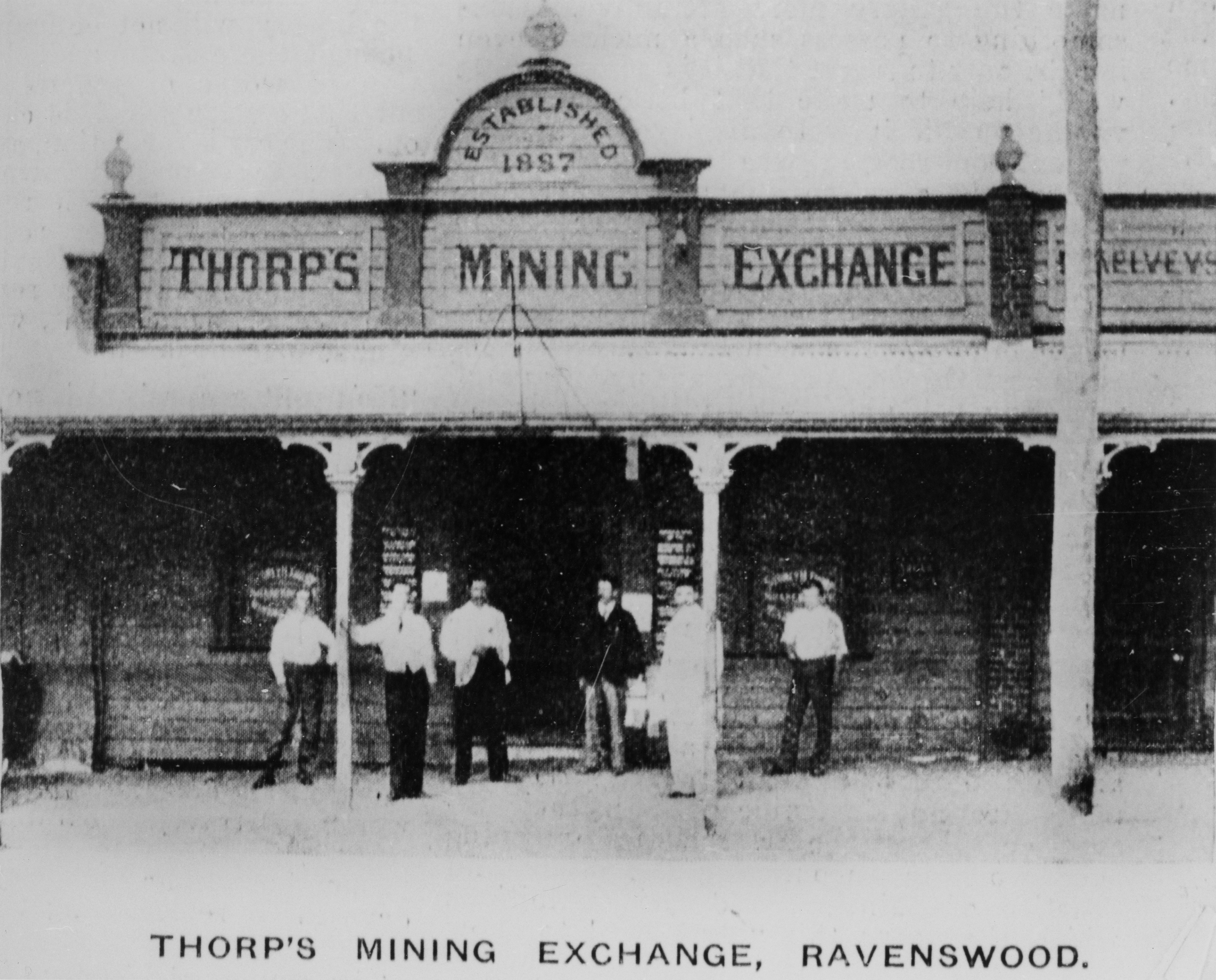
Thorps Mining Exchange, established 1887

Sydney Hood Thorpe was a sharebroker and mining agent based in Charters Towers, who had established a mining exchange there in 1887. In 1900 he set up a branch business in Ravenswood, trading as Thorp's Mining Exchange from a building in Barton Street which also housed a chemist and law library. This building was destroyed by fire in August 1901, a year of both destruction and construction in Ravenswood as the New Ravenswood Company rebuilt mining infrastructure, business improved and new commercial buildings went up following two large fires which destroyed whole blocks of the commercial area. Following the first of these in April, the Imperial Hotel and two adjoining rows of elegant shops were constructed in Macrossan Street, next to the Ravenswood Hotel. In 1902, Thorp purchased land opposite these new buildings. It is not known if Thorp ever conducted business from this address himself.

He was a shareholder in Hollimans Limited, a company that had been established in Charters Towers for some time, supplying the mining industry with household goods, guns and sporting equipment, as well as being agents for such mining essentials as steam engines, pumps, conveyors, compressors and parts for stamper batteries. They were also estate and commission agents. They opened a branch in Thorp's building in 1903 and it may have been constructed with this tenancy in mind, although they did not actually own the building until 1920. Hollimans at Ravenswood were "machinery, hardware and timber merchants" who carried a large stock of new and second hand mining machinery and spares as well as furniture and ironmongery. Thorp's Buildings also had other tenants, including a dentist, and the upper floor may have been used as offices.

The mining boom at Ravenswood did not last and ironically, by the time Hollimans moved into the store, the population had peaked. After 1908 the cost of extraction and continued exploration rose as returns fell and by World War I it became apparent that returns would not pick up again. Buildings began to be sold for removal and in 1916 rail services were cut. In 1917 the New Ravenswood Company closed. In the 1920s most of the timber buildings in Ravenswood were moved away, although brick buildings, such Thorp's Buildings could not be moved.

Ravenswood Shire was absorbed into Dalrymple Shire in 1929 and in 1930 Ravenswood became the first Queensland town to lose its railway connection. Mining had a modest revival in the 1930s and in 1932 Robert Burns, previously a manager of Hollimans, leased the building in conjunction with a partner, John Fritz. They operated as Burns & Fritz Hardware also selling groceries and eventually purchased the building from Hollimans in 1948. In 1957, following the death of Fritz, the building was sold to Frank and Blanche Weinheimer. By the 1960s Ravenswood had reached its lowest ebb with a population of about 70. At this point, tourists began to take a growing interest in the town, studies were made of the buildings and work began to conserve them.

In 1973 the building was acquired by Sidney and Isabel Kelly but had been vacant for some time before being purchased in 1987 and renovated as an arts centre by Trevor and Pamela Nance. In the 1980s the whole town was listed by the Australian Heritage Commission and the National Trust of Queensland. In 1987 Carpentaria Gold Ltd opened a new open cut mine using modern heap leaching processes.

In 1989 Thorp's Buildings was sold to the current owners who opened a tearoom in the building, using the adjoining shop to sell arts and crafts. The upper floor was used for residential purposes. Though the shop is currently vacant, the owner still lives on the premises.

== Description ==
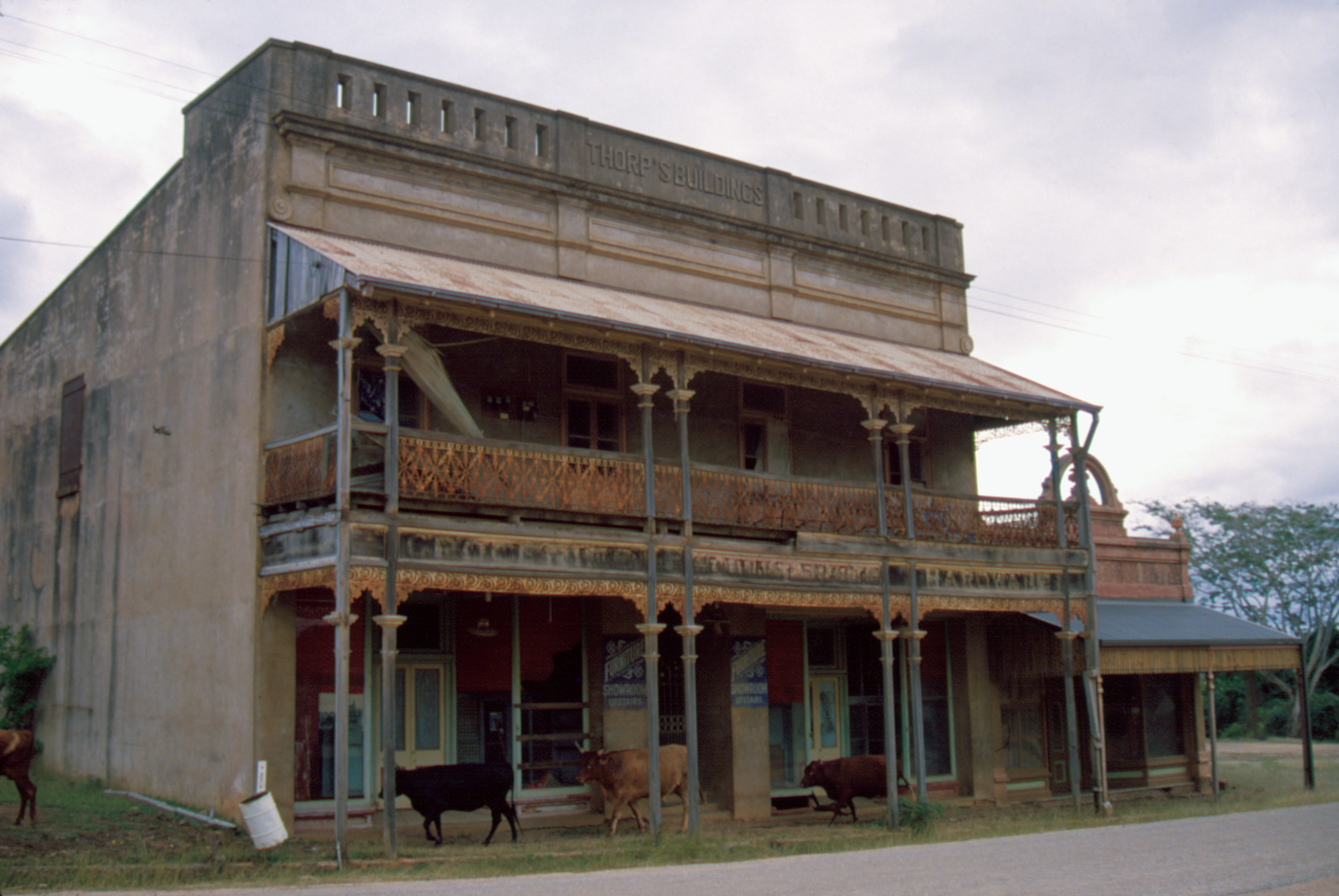
Thorps building in dilapidated condition, 1985

Thorp's Building is located in the main street of Ravenswood opposite the Imperial Hotel and adjacent to a single storey shop of approximately the same age. Ravenswood is located in a mining landscape which consists of disturbed ground with scattered ruins and mullock heaps, set amongst distinctive chinkee apple trees and rubber vines.

The building is a two-storey rendered brick building with a corrugated iron skillion roof falling to the rear which is concealed by a parapet bearing the name Thorp's Buildings in raised letters. It consists of two shops at ground level with professional offices above. The front of the building has verandahs to both floors, supported by paired timber posts with cast iron lace brackets and valance and cast iron panels on the upper floor. The upper floor has four sets of French doors opening on to the verandah.

A central entrance with iron gates leads to a passage and stairs to the first floor. There are shop entrances on either side of this entrance with recessed timber doors and timber framed plate glass display windows. The interior of the shops are relatively intact, including the pressed metal ceilings and wall cladding. The building has its own gas producer and still has gas piping and fittings.

== Heritage listing ==
Thorps Building was listed on the Queensland Heritage Register on 21 October 1992 having satisfied the following criteria.

The place is important in demonstrating the evolution or pattern of Queensland's history.

Ravenswood is one of the earliest sites associated with major gold mining in North Queensland which gave significant impetus to the economic and social development of the region. Thorp's Buildings, as a substantial commercial building intended to stock essential supplies for miners and mining and to compete in quality with other commercial buildings being constructed in Ravenswood in the 1900s, demonstrates this development.

The place is important in demonstrating the principal characteristics of a particular class of cultural places.

Thorp's Buildings is the now the two storey store from a commercial centre which, in the early 1900s, featured a line of handsome and fashionable stores on either side of southern Macrossan street. In its form, layout and decoration it is a good example of a quality commercial building of the Federation era. Its original usage, as a provider of everything from household goods to mining machinery, accurately reflects the needs of a mining community at this time.

The place is important because of its aesthetic significance.

Thorp's Buildings, forming a group with the adjacent single storey shop, is an attractive group which is an important and dominant feature of the Ravenswood townscape.

The place has a special association with the life or work of a particular person, group or organisation of importance in Queensland's history.

Thorp's Buildings is important for its association with Sydney Hood Thorp, a sharebroker and mining agent who played an important role in the economy of the Ravenswood goldfield. It also had a long association with Robert Daniel Burns, first as manager of Hollimans and then as part owner of Burns & Fritz.
