= Chapel Street Bridge =

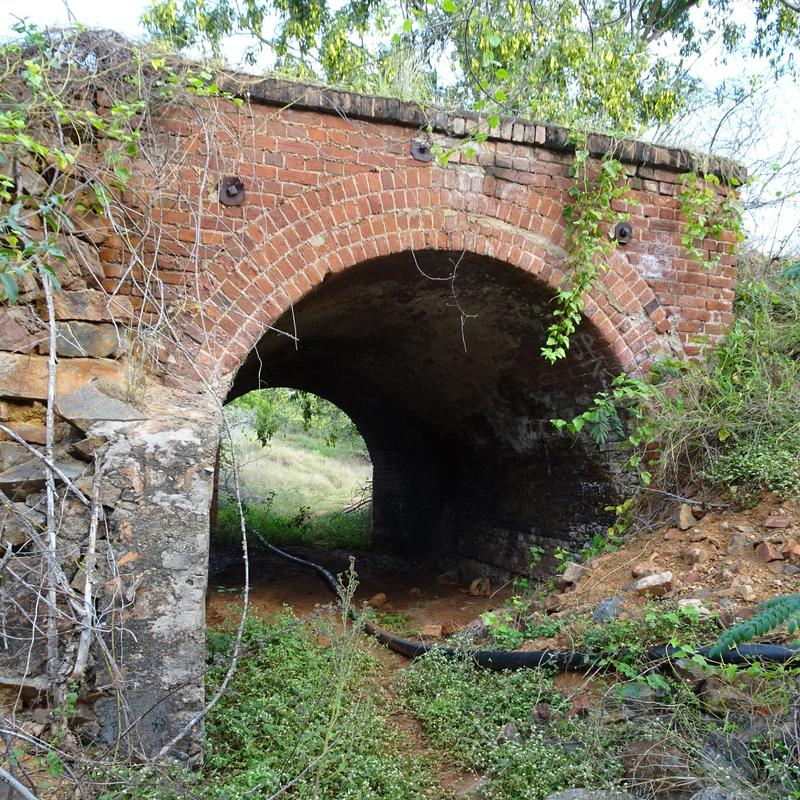
- Chapel Street Bridge from north, 2017

- Location within Queensland
- 20.0988°S 146.8944°E
- Location: Chapel Street, Ravenswood, Charters Towers Region, Queensland, Australia

History
- Design period: 1870s–1890s (Late 19th century)
- Built: 1895–1898, Single–arch

Queensland Heritage Register
- Official name: Chapel Street Bridge
- Type: state heritage
- Designated: 29 November 2019
- Reference no.: 650242
- Type: Transport-road: Bridge-road
- Theme: Exploiting, utilising and transforming the land: Exploiting natural resources; Moving goods, people and information: Using draught animals

Chapel Street Bridge is a heritage-listed road bridge at Chapel Street, Ravenswood, Charters Towers Region, Queensland, Australia. It was built from 1895 to 1898. It was added to the Queensland Heritage Register on 29 November 2019.

== History ==
The single-arch, red-brick road bridge on Chapel Street, over Slaughter Yard Creek, Ravenswood, was most likely constructed by the Ravenswood Divisional Board c. 1895–1900, to replace an earlier timber bridge and improve access between Ravenswood and the gold mines at Sandy Creek (and their associated town of Evlinton), located almost 4 km southeast of Ravenswood. The Chapel Street Bridge is important in illustrating the importance of mining to the economy of Ravenswood during the 1890s. It is also rare as the only known example of an early brick-arch road bridge in Queensland.

Ravenswood, part of the traditional land of the Birriah people, is located about 85 km south of Townsville and 65 km east of Charters Towers. The Ravenswood goldfield, which included the John Bull reef near Sandy Creek, was the fifth largest producer of gold in Queensland during the late 19th and early 20th centuries. Its main mining periods were:

- alluvial gold and shallow reef mining (1868–72)
- attempts to extract gold from sulphide ores below the water table (c. 1872–98)
- the New Ravenswood Company era (1899–1917)
- small scale mining and re-treatment of old mullock heaps and tailings dumps (1919–60s)
- modern open cut operations from 1987 onwards

European settlement of the Kennedy Land District in north Queensland commenced with the founding of Bowen in 1861, and the spread of pastoralists through the hinterland. Pastoral stations were established up the valley of the Burdekin River, including "Ravenswood" and "Merri Merriwa". Alluvial gold was discovered in tributaries of Connolly Creek, on Merri Merriwa Station, in late 1868. Prospectors soon established "Middle Camp" (later Donnybrook) on Tucker's Creek, and "Lower Camp" on Trieste Creek, with about 700 miners on the field by early 1869. In April 1869, the goldfield's richest alluvial discoveries occurred in three dry creek beds close to the site of Ravenswood. The parent reefs of this alluvial gold were soon located, but a lack of water meant that miners did not establish Ravenswood (initially called "Upper Camp") until October 1869, after a storm temporarily resolved the water issue. The first machinery for crushing quartz ore to extract gold was WO Hodkinson's five stamp crushing battery, called the Lady Marion (or Lady Marian) Mill. It operated at Burnt Point (south of Upper Camp) from 18 April 1870.

The Ravenswood goldfield (about 300 square miles) was proclaimed on 3 November 1870, and the town of Ravenswood was proclaimed on 19 May 1871. The town area initially comprised an area of one square mile (259ha). This was increased to four square miles (1036ha) on 13 July 1883. In 1871, the population of the goldfield was 900, with over half being in Ravenswood. The town developed on either side of Elphinstone Creek. A temporary bridge (a log) existed by 1870. The first permanent bridge over the creek was constructed, of timber, in 1873.

Despite its promising start, in 1872, the Ravenswood goldfield entered a "period of depression", as its most important mines reached the water table, and difficult to process "mundic" ore, at about 70 ft (21m) deep. Although the oxidised quartz ('red stone' or "brown stone" quartz) close to the surface yielded its gold using traditional methods of mechanical crushing, below the water table the gold was in fine particles, mixed with sulphide ores, and was not easily recovered by mechanical means. Although only a percentage of the gold was recoverable from the mundic ore with the technology available at the time, Ravenswood's mines continued to be viable into the 1880s.

There was an increase in productivity in the mid-1880s, due to good returns from the mines on the John Bull reef, located on the east bank of Sandy Creek, almost 4 km southeast of Ravenswood. The returns from the John Bull reef "have on several occasions alone prevented Ravenswood from drifting into a state of absolute stagnation". The ore in the John Bull reef was more easily recovered through mechanical means (more "free"), than in other reefs on the goldfield. The Chapel Street Bridge is a product of the success of the John Bull reef, and the resulting need for a road link between Ravenswood and Sandy Creek. By 1896, Chapel Street headed northeast out of Ravenswood, to the south of Elphinstone Creek, crossed Slaughter Yard Creek and then connected to Evlinton Road, which turned southeast towards Sandy Creek/Evlinton.

Work on the John Bull reef, just south of the later site of the town of Evlinton (initially known as Sandy Creek), had occurred from 1879 - and by October that year crushings from a stamper battery on the John Bull were being carted into Ravenswood. Reef mining at Sandy Creek had started after the discovery of the Politician and Australia Felix reefs, southwest of the John Bull reef, in 1871. The John Bull claim, "laid off in May last", had proved payable, with a 5-stamper battery erected on the claim. The John Bull Gold Mining Company Ltd (formed in 1881), worked the John Bull PC lease on the reef, while the John Bull Block lease, to the south, was worked by Hugh Hawthorne Barton and Andrew Trenfield by July 1882. A 15-stamp battery was erected on the John Bull Block in 1883, when it was reported that "Sandy Creek bids fair to become a very busy little place at no distant date". By 1885, Sandy Creek had a population of 181, the fourth most populous centre on the Ravenswood goldfield, after Ravenswood, Ravenswood Junction, and One Mile. Although the John Bull's ore was low quality, the reef was large, and it continued to produce well during 1884 – the year that the railway reached Ravenswood from Ravenswood Junction on the Great Northern railway. The Black Jack, Mellaneur, and John Bull reefs had the largest yields on the gold field that year. Ravenswood Junction was previously called Cunningham's water holes. The railway opened to Ravenswood, with a station north of Elphinstone Creek, in December 1884. Later plans for railway extensions to Ravenswood from Bowen (approaching Ravenswood from the northeast, via Hillsborough) and Clermont (approaching Ravenswood from the south) never eventuated.

By 1886, the settlement at Sandy Creek was called "Evlinton", and was part of a mail route. Although Sandy Creek Provisional School, established in 1885, was renamed Evlinton Provisional School in 1886, the town of Evlinton was not surveyed until early 1890. A school reserve, of two acres (0.8ha), was gazetted in 1896. Evlinton Provisional School became a state school in 1909.

A timber bridge was extant over Slaughter Yard Creek on Chapel Street, on the road between Ravenswood and Evlinton, by 1887. This bridge was the scene of a fatal accident in August 1887, when Joseph Lane, a miner working at the John Bull Block, fell off his horse when it slipped on the bridge while he was riding into Ravenswood. The Ravenswood Divisional Board is likely to have built the bridge, as after the Divisional Boards Act 1879, responsibility for local roads passed from Queensland's Department of Public Works to local governments - although the Queensland Government still provided grants and loans. In 1880, the Ravenswood Divisional Board requested £500 for repairing the roads in and about Ravenswood, and for a culvert over One Mile Creek, on the main road from Ravenswood to Charters Towers, via Kirk and Rochford. Heavy rains in early 1882 severely damaged the bridge over the Elphinstone Creek in the centre of Ravenswood, and the Board applied for a government loan for repairs.

The John Bull reef remained one of the best producers on the Ravenswood goldfield from the mid-1880s to the early 1890s Other top producers were the General Grant, Sunset, New England, Wild Irish Girl, and Melaneur reefs (all located within Ravenswood), plus the silver lodes of the One Mile, at Totley, north of Ravenswood. . While the two John Bull leases were working, there was a large mining community at nearby Evlinton. The yield from this mine proved for many years very constant. By October 1887, the John Bull Block was 'held to the extent of three-fourths by Messrs. [Kyle] Sidley and [Andrew] Trenfield'. The holders of the remaining fourth were Messrs. West, A Ball and the Hon. W Aplin', all of Townsville. Trenfield and Sidley had also operated a butcher shop. In June 1888, the John Bull Gold Mining Company Ltd (John Bull PC) was in liquidation, and by 1891 their shafts and machinery were owned by Sidley and Trenfield. In 1891, the John Bull Block mine and mill employed 60 hands. "Although they put through a low-grade ore, the size of the reef and the great number of tons passing under their stampers (twenty head) give a live and busy appearance to their little township of Evlinton"

The Ravenswood Divisional Board attempted to replace the timber Chapel Street Bridge in 1888. It sought a grant of £1000, to build bridges over the One Mile Creek (on the main road to Ravenswood Junction), and "over the crossing on [the] road to Sandy Creek, at which place there is a considerable amount of heavy traffic". However, no grant appears to have eventuated at this time, as the government preferred that the Divisional Board borrow the money. However, the Ravenswood Divisional Board did take out a £500 loan for bridge and road purposes in 1890.

The bridge's replacement was delayed when Evlinton's prosperity was interrupted in the early 1890s. The John Bull Block had already extracted the best quality ore, and had continued issues with water ingress. This led to a stoppage of work in 1892, which "caused an almost total desertion of the little township there (Evlinton), and a shifting of dwellings in here and elsewhere". The Ravenswood goldfield's production in 1893 was its lowest since 1886.

A revival in the fortunes of Evlinton and the John Bull reef occurred from 1894, when Sidley and Trenfield sold their mines and the St George (20 head) battery to Archibald L Wilson (1852–1935). Wilson had arrived in Ravenswood in 1878, after gaining a diploma in mining engineering in Edinburgh, and working in New Zealand and on the Palmer River. He was publican of the Silver King Hotel in Totley in the 1880s. At the end of 1893, Wilson travelled to London to float the John Bull property, and his syndicate purchased the John Bull mines, with himself as general manager, in April 1894. Digging of a new vertical shaft commenced in late 1894.

Gold bearing ore was struck in October 1895, at 626 ft (191m) depth, and by 1896 the John Bull was considered the "chief mine" on the Ravenswood goldfield. Although the ore was low grade, and there were "oceans of water" to pump out, Wilson had set up a cyaniding plant nearby, to treat tailings as soon as they had been crushed. He extracted 1800oz of gold from 5000 tons of ore during 1896; and supplying the 20 stamper battery with cordwood required "quite a little colony" of timber-getters and carters. "Sandy Creek (Evlinton), with two public-houses, boarding houses, school, and its mill at work, present[ed] quite a lively appearance, particularly on "pay night"". In 1897, Wilson achieved a record for economic working at the John Bull mines, extracting 4817oz of smelted gold, and 578oz of cyanide bullion, from 11,272 tons of ore.

The recovery of Evlinton in the late 1890s led to the construction of the current brick bridge on Chapel Street, between 1895 and 1900. Due to the issue of water in the mines, large quantities of timber was required for close timbering in the shafts, which would also have increased business traffic into Evlinton. In addition, in late 1895 ore from the John Bull mines was dispatched to the Mabel Mill in Ravenswood for crushing. In May 1895, the Ravenswood Divisional Board asked for a £500 grant to repair several roads and their bridges, including the road from Ravenswood to Evlinton. "These are all main roads and lead to thriving mining centres, particularly the Evlinton and Old [?] roads, where there are several large gold mines being developed.... All the roads and bridges thereon...are almost untrafficable, particularly in bad weather". The expenditure statement of the Division of Ravenswood for the second half of 1895 refers to a £25 18s and 8p contract for a wall on "Slaughter-yard Gully", while the statement for the first half of 1896 lists a "retaining wall at Slaughter-yard Gully Bridge", for £25 18s and 9p, deducted from the "Main Roads Grant Account". Later, £48 is deducted, for a bridge, from the "John Bull and Standard Road Account" during the second half of 1900, suggesting that the Chapel Street Bridge was built in two stages, first the abutments, and then the brick arch.

Constructed of red brick, the Chapel Street Bridge has a semi-circular arch and low-height solid spandrels (side walls, north and south) with render-capped coping. Postholes formed in the coping suggest the bridge originally had a balustrade. The angled abutment wing walls on the upstream (south) side were designed to channel water flow during times of flood and, along with the stone retaining walls on the upstream (north) side, help stabilise the abutment embankments and roadway approaches (east and west). Slaughter Yard Creek was part of the Elphinstone Creek system, which was prone to quick rises and flooding during significant rain events. In 2019, Slaughter Yard Creek was a dry gully, which runs north to join the Left Branch of Elphinstone Creek, about 120m downstream from the Chapel Street Bridge.

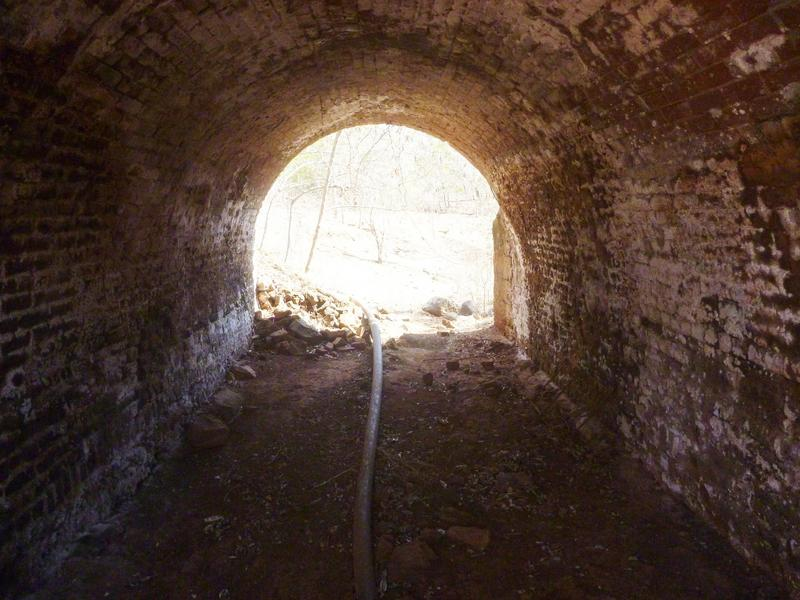
Chapel Street Bridge, view through arch, from south, 2015

The Chapel Street Bridge is a rare Queensland example of a brick-arch road bridge, where historically, due to an abundance of hardwood timber for bridge piers and decking, the preference has been for girder and truss types of timber, steel, or concrete construction – although early pipe culverts used brick, and some bridges used bricks for abutments or retaining walls. Brick was also used in Queensland for railway bridge abutments and piers, retaining walls, and culverts. Early examples of brick culverts are found on the Main Range Railway (1865–67). One example of a masonry road bridge in Queensland is a c. 1865 Stone Bridge on the Dalrymple Gap Track, which consists of stone retaining walls inset with a circular brick culvert. A 1930s arched Little Crystal Creek Bridge crosses Little Crystal Creek at Mount Spec. It is faced in stone, but is actually concrete. Comparatively more common in the southern states of Australia, masonry arch bridges rely on their curved arch rib and end supports for stability, and characteristically have solid spandrels. Bridge spandrels (the space between the deck and arch rib) can be solid (walled and filled with soil, more common for masonry arches) or open (more common for timber and metal arches).

The bricks for the Chapel Street Bridge may have been locally manufactured, although quality bricks were available from Townsville, particularly after the railway reached Ravenswood in 1884. Most buildings in 19th century Ravenswood were constructed of timber, but bricks were used for mining infrastructure such as chimneys, flues, furnaces and engine mounts – so skilled bricklayers would have been available on the goldfield. At least one brick chimney existed by 1880, while a 56 ft (17m) brick chimney was present at HH Barton's chlorination works in 1888. During 1891–92, the contractor Robert Mann locally constructed the bricks for, and erected, a 90 ft (27m) brick chimney and furnaces, for the Australasian Gold Extracting Company (New England lease). Later, a block of timber commercial buildings in Ravenswood, lost in a disastrous fire in April 1901, was rebuilt using bricks, suggesting confident expectations of permanence for Ravenswood.

However, the revival of nearby Evlinton in the late 1890s was a short-term phenomenon. Although Wilson was able to wring enough return from cyaniding the ore to pay the John Bull's operating expenses, there was insufficient capital for development work. Wilson left for London in 1898 to seek investors for other mines, and although the John Bull Block mine had a record weekly crush of 298oz of gold from 198 tons of ore in 1899, the John Bull mines closed in January 1901.

Evlinton vanished after the closure of the John Bull mines, although the town did not die immediately. A social and dance was held at Evlinton State School in 1916, in aid of Ravenswood Red Cross Society, when people from Ravenswood travelled "by motorcar, buggy etc" to the function; and the school was also used as a polling place for elections, prior to its closure in 1921.

Although the John Bull mines at Sandy Creek had closed, Ravenswood entered a new period of prosperity from 1900, thanks to Wilson. While in London, in 1899 he had floated both the Donnybrook Blocks Mining Syndicate and the New Ravenswood Company. Using British capital, Wilson introduced modern machinery to work the main Ravenswood mines and the New Ravenswood Company effectively reshaped Ravenswood's landscape. Wilson was known as "the uncrowned king of Ravenswood". The Ravenswood goldfield's population peaked at 4707 in 1903. The population of Ravenswood was 1862 (based on 1901 census figures).

The early 20th century revival at Ravenswood ended in 1917, after declining yields, increased costs, and industrial disputes. World War I (1914–18) also increased labour and material costs. On 24 March 1917, the New Ravenswood Company ceased operations, ending large-scale mining in Ravenswood for the next 70 years. Up to 1917, Ravenswood was the fifth largest gold producer in Queensland, after Charters Towers, Mount Morgan, Gympie and the Palmer goldfield. Ravenswood was also the second largest producer of reef gold in north Queensland, after Charters Towers. By 1917 the Ravenswood goldfield had produced over 850,000oz (24.1 tonnes) of gold, and 1,000,000oz (28.4 tonnes) of silver. By the end of 1928, Ravenswood had produced 885,805oz. By comparison, production at Charters Towers and the Cape River field by this time was 6,673,398oz, Rockhampton and Mount Morgan was 5,099,570oz, Gympie was 3,388,855oz, and the Palmer River was 1,329,666oz.

After 1917, the Ravenswood goldfield entered a period of hibernation, with intermittent small-scale attempts at mining until the 1960s. During the 1920s, prior to the closure of the railway branch line to Ravenswood in 1930, hundreds of the town's timber buildings were dismantled and railed away; and by 1934 only 357 people remained in Ravenswood, and it became the first Queensland town to lose its railway. In the 1960 and 1970s, Ravenswood's population shrank to its nadir of about 70 people. However, gold mining recommenced at Ravenswood in the 1980s, due to a rise in the gold price and the efficiencies gained from open cut mining and modern cyanide metallurgical extraction processes. In 2011, the population of Ravenswood was 349.

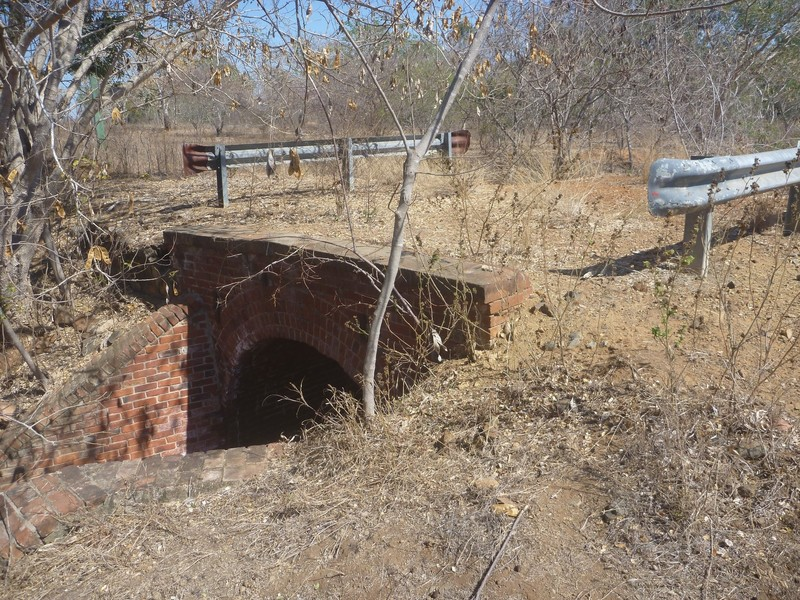
Chapel Street Bridge, view from southeast, showing metal road guards blocking access, 2015

The Chapel Street Bridge was closed to traffic in the 1980s, due to National Trust interest in its preservation. Restoration estimates were given for reconstructing a damaged section, using salvaged fallen bricks. Although closed, the bridge survives as a physical reminder that the mines at Sandy Creek, once accessed via the road that crossed the bridge, were important to Ravenswood's economy. In 2019, modern metal road guards block access to the bridge, which is located almost 300m north of the northern rim of Carpentaria Gold's Sarsfield pit.

== Description ==
The Chapel Street Bridge crosses Slaughter Yard Creek and is located on Chapel Street, approximately 100m southwest of the intersection with Griffin Street, on the northeast outskirts of Ravenswood, North Queensland.

The bridge is approximately 4.2m long x 8m wide and constructed of red facebrick. It has a single-span semi-circular arch rib and low-height solid spandrels (side walls, north and south) with coping. The bridge deck is earth fill. Three bracing metal tie rods connect the spandrels across the width of the bridge, internal to the structure. The bridge abutments (east and west) have facebrick wing walls to channel water flow on the upstream (south) side and drystone retaining walls on the downstream (north) side.

== Heritage listing ==
Chapel Street Bridge was listed on the Queensland Heritage Register on 29 November 2019 having satisfied the following criteria.

The place is important in demonstrating the evolution or pattern of Queensland's history.

The Chapel Street Bridge (c. 1895-1900) is important in demonstrating the development of the Ravenswood goldfield, the first significant reef mining goldfield in north Queensland and the fifth largest gold producer in Queensland during the late 19th and early 20th centuries. Built on the road connecting the mines of the John Bull reef at Sandy Creek to Ravenswood, the Chapel Street Bridge, as mining-related infrastructure, is important in illustrating the importance of mining to the economy of Ravenswood during the 1890s.

The place demonstrates rare, uncommon or endangered aspects of Queensland's cultural heritage.

The Chapel Street Bridge is rare as the only known Queensland example of an early brick-arch road bridge, a design form that has always been rare in Queensland.

The place is important in demonstrating the principal characteristics of a particular class of cultural places.

The Chapel Street Bridge is a rare and intact Queensland example of an early brick-arch road bridge. Characteristics of this type of transport infrastructure include: brick construction; open curved arch; solid spandrels; abutments; roadway approaches; and spanning of a watercourse or other physical obstacle.
