= Ravenswood Court House and Police Station =

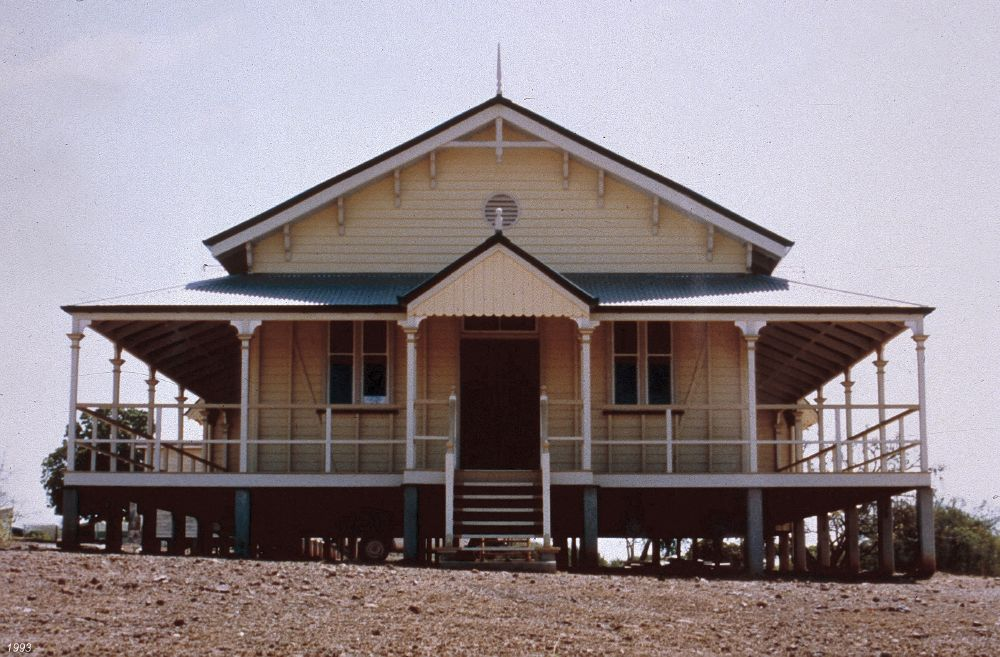
- Ravenswood Court House, 1993

- Location within Queensland Location within Australia
- 20.0989°S 146.8889°E
- Location: Raven Street, Ravenswood, Charters Towers Region, Queensland, Australia

History
- Design period: 1870s–1890s (late 19th century)
- Built: 1882

Site notes
- Architect: Queensland Department of Public Works

Queensland Heritage Register
- Official name: Ravenswood Court House Group (former), Court House and Police Station, Ravenswood
- Type: state heritage (built)
- Designated: 27 January 1994
- Reference no.: 601204
- Significant period: 1880s (historical); 1880s (fabric); 1880s–1920s (social)
- Significant components: cell block, barracks – police, court house, police station
- Builders: A Donald (court house) and FA Sparre (police station)

Ravenswood Court House and Police Station is a heritage-listed former courthouse (now museum) and police station at Raven Street, Ravenswood, Charters Towers Region, Queensland, Australia. They were designed by the Queensland Department of Public Works and were built in 1882 by A Donald (court house) and FA Sparre (police station). They are also known as Ravenswood Court House Group. They were added to the Queensland Heritage Register on 27 January 1994.

== History ==
The Ravenswood Court House and Police Station consists of three buildings erected on the site in 1882 – the Court House, Police Station, and Cells (formerly part of the Police Station), all of which were removed from the site in 1965 and subsequently returned during the 1980s.

The buildings replaced an earlier Court House (1870), Police Barracks (1871), and Lockup (1871), which were amongst a number of buildings erected by the Queensland colonial government to provide the necessary infrastructure to both encourage and control the early days of Ravenswood's gold rush.

Gold was to dominate mining in Queensland from the 1850s to the first World War, with major discoveries and consequential "rushes" in such places as Clermont (1861), Gympie (1867), Ravenswood (1868), Charters Towers (1872), Palmer Gold Field (1873), and Mount Morgan (1882). Such discoveries were to make Queensland the third largest producer of gold in Australia, after Western Australia and Victoria.

The initial and very successful gold mining in Ravenswood was by panning of the alluvial gold. This was then replaced by reef mining. By 1871, Ravenswood's troubles had begun; as mines sank beneath the water table it was found that the gold could not easily be extracted from the mundic sulphides. In Ravenswood this caused particular problems due in part to the variety and unpredictability of the distribution of sulphides in the ore. Greater capital was now required to fund the various technologies for extracting the gold. As a result many miners left for other gold fields, such as the recently discovered Charters Towers field, which was to quickly overtake Ravenswood as a gold producer and most important inland North Queensland town.

Despite the exodus, the town continued; the economy of town funded by mining (on a reduced scale) and the establishment of silver mines at nearby Totley. It was also substantially aided by the building of further government infrastructure, which included the opening of the Great Northern railway from Townsville in 1884, a new Post and Telegraph Office (1885), and Hospital (1887) as well as the new Court House and Police Station (1882).

The Court House and the Police Station were erected by contractors A Donald (for £1,200) and FA Sparre (for £885) respectively and designed by the Department of Public Works. The designs were types (or variations of types) developed by the Department during this time which could be adapted to the varying requirements of the widespread colony. They enabled the Department to establish a high standard of public architecture for what were relatively modest buildings, which at the same time could be erected by local contractors.

The Court House was a T-shaped timber building with verandah back and front; with a large court room located to the front and offices to the rear. The Police Station was erected as a U-shaped timber building containing an office, quarters for the local policeman and his family, and three cells. At this time, a sergeant's residence is recorded as being on the site. This was sold and removed in 1929 and appears to have been the original Police Barracks erected in 1871. A stable to house the police horses is recorded on the site by 1899, however, this may well have existed prior to this time. By 1912, a brick retaining wall with a white picket fence had been erected along Raven Street.

By this time, the mining industry in Ravenswood was in decline. The great strike in Ravenswood of 1912/1913 left a bitterly divided community; the mines continued to decline and the outbreak of World War I in 1914 lead to an increase in costs and a scarcity of labour. This decline was to be repeated throughout Australia in the post World War I period; with the mining industry not regenerating (albeit in a new form in which coal, aluminium, and iron ore took precedence in the new markets) until after the second World War.

In the following years, mining in the town continued, but the boom was over: much of the population moved away, a number of buildings were removed, and in 1930 Ravenswood became the first Queensland town to lose its railway. In 1928, the Police Constable (who also acted as Assistant Mining Registrar, Acting Clerk of Petty Sessions, Acting Stock Inspector and Land Agent) reported (in the context of seeking to justify expenditure on police buildings) that although mining was quiet, there were indications that it might accelerate at any time. In fact a small revival occurred during the 1930s and early 1940s and later revivals as new technology allowed for economical mining of lower grade ores, but Ravenswood never returned to the prosperity of the early 1900s and was not rebuilt.

In 1965, both the Court House and Police Station joined the long line of buildings to be removed from Ravenswood. Although some changes had been made to the buildings in the intervening years (including conversion of one of the cells to a bathroom), they were substantially as built when removed to Mt Ravenswood Station, where the Police Station was used (in several pieces) as ringers' accommodation.

Since the 1970s, numerous studies of the Ravenswood area have been completed; in the 1980s the whole town was listed by the Australian Heritage Commission and the National Trust of Queensland. During this time, as a result of the flooding of the Burdekin Dam, the Police Station, Cells (now annexed from the station), and Court House were moved back to the site. This period also saw the commencement of open cut gold mining by Carpentaria Gold Pty Ltd and the growth of cultural tourism in the town.

The Court House is now the Ravenswood Court House Museum.

== Description ==
The Court House Group, on the northern corner of Macrossan and Raven Streets, is located near the town centre of Ravenswood on a raised site overlooking Elphinstone Creek to the south. Ravenswood is located in a mining landscape, which consists of disturbed ground with scattered ruins and mullock heaps, set amongst distinctive chinky apples and rubber vines. The group consists of three buildings; a court house, barracks and cell block.

The court house is a single-storeyed timber building with a corrugated iron gable roof and concrete stumps. The building has a T-shaped plan, with the court room forming the southwest wing surrounded on three sides by verandahs, and offices form the northeast wing with a verandah on the northeast side.

The building has weatherboard cladding to the exposed gable ends, and single-skin exposed framing to the verandah walls. Verandahs have a timber rail balustrade, with timber posts and capitals. French doors open to northeast verandah, with the southwest wing having sash windows and a central projecting gabled entrance porch with finial. The southwest gable has a finial and paired timber brackets, and the exposed gable ends have a casement window with timber and iron hood.

Internally, the building contains early court room furniture and fittings including timber gallery seating, witness stand, dock, and Judge's bench, with horizontal timber boarding to walls and a raked ceiling.

The barracks, located to the north of the court house, is a single-storeyed, single-skin timber building with a corrugated iron gable roof and concrete stumps. The building has a verandah on the southeast, the wall of which is clad with fibrous cement sheeting, with two french doors and a sash window and timber door. The exposed walls have weatherboard cladding, with glass louvred windows on the northwest, and a sash window with metal hood on the northeast. The southern corner has had some cladding and part of the verandah removed.

Internally, the building has three rooms, the northern one being lined with horizontal boarding, and boarded ceilings.

The cell block, located to the northeast of the court house, and to the west of the barracks, is a single-storeyed, single-skin timber building with a corrugated iron hipped roof and concrete stumps. The building has a verandah on the southeast, with four doors and a window. The exposed walls have weatherboard cladding, with glass louvred windows, a casement window and a door on the northwest, a glass louvred window on the southwest, and a sash window on the northeast.

Internally, the building has four rooms, some of which are lined and have boarded ceilings. Timber cell doors with original hardware have been removed, but remain on the site.

== Heritage listing ==
The Ravenswood Court House and Police Station were listed on the Queensland Heritage Register on 27 January 1994 having satisfied the following criteria.

The place is important in demonstrating the evolution or pattern of Queensland's history.

Ravenswood is one of the earliest sites associated with major gold mining in North Queensland which gave significant impetus to the economic and social development of the region. The state's encouragement for such development was demonstrated by the establishment of supporting public infrastructure. Moreover, the Court House and Police buildings, erected in Ravenswood during the 1880s, form part of an apparently deliberate government policy to support the town during a period of economic decline.

The place is important in demonstrating the principal characteristics of a particular class of cultural places.

The Court House and Police buildings were erected according to architectural types developed at this time by the Public Works Department.

The place is important because of its aesthetic significance.

Located on a prominent rise in the centre of the town, the Court House and Police buildings, as was the usual practice, were erected on the same government reserve. The Court House, which includes early furniture and fittings, is particularly intact.

The place has a strong or special association with a particular community or cultural group for social, cultural or spiritual reasons.

Ravenswood is one of the earliest sites associated with major gold mining in North Queensland which gave significant impetus to the economic and social development of the region.

The place has a special association with the life or work of a particular person, group or organisation of importance in Queensland's history.

The Court House and Police buildings were erected according to architectural types developed at this time by the Public Works Department, which was instrumental in developing the quality of building in the state.
