= Ravenswood Post Office =

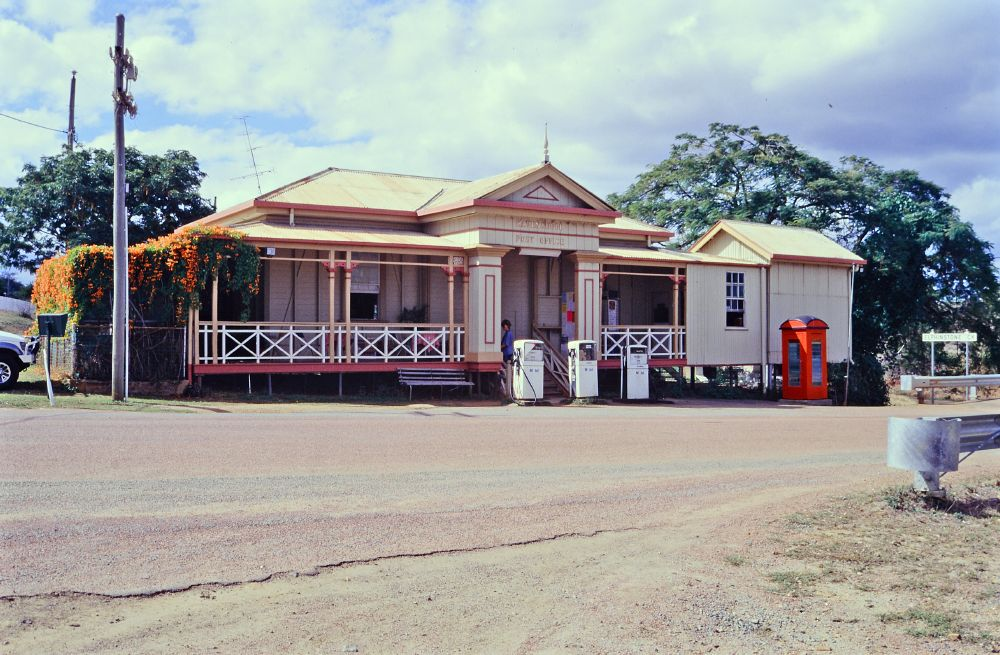
- Ravenswood Post Office, 1997

- Location within Queensland Location within Australia
- 20.0994°S 146.8895°E
- Location: Macrossan Street, Ravenswood, Charters Towers Region, Queensland, Australia

History
- Design period: 1870s–1890s (late 19th century)
- Built: 1885

Queensland Heritage Register
- Official name: Ravenswood Post Office and Residence
- Type: state heritage (built)
- Designated: 21 October 1992
- Reference no.: 600447
- Significant period: 1885 (fabric); 1870s–ongoing (historical, social)
- Significant components: post & telegraph office, residential accommodation – post master's house/quarters
- Builders: Queensland Public Works Department

Ravenswood Post Office is a heritage-listed post office at Macrossan Street, Ravenswood, Charters Towers Region, Queensland, Australia. It was built in 1885 by the Queensland Public Works Department. It was added to the Queensland Heritage Register on 21 October 1992.

== History ==
The Ravenswood Post Office was constructed in 1885 on the corner of Macrossan and Raven Streets, replacing an earlier Post and Telegraph Office which had been in use since 1873.

Ravenswood was one of several important goldfields which formed a major component in the development of North Queensland. The need to access and exploit gold finds determined the path of railways, the establishment of related industries and commerce and the location of settlements. Some of these were short lived "rushes", where tent and shanty townships disappeared almost as quickly as they rose. Other settlements based on goldfields became established towns with government and civic buildings, shops and family homes and survived as such. A few became important centres, only to fade away as gold yields fell. Ravenswood was one of these.

Gold was discovered at Ravenswood in 1868 a few years after pastoral settlement of the area had begun. Ravenswood gold was in reefs and a small battery was first set up in 1869, followed by the Lady Marian Mill in 1870. The settlement was also surveyed at this time, but by then the goldfield itself, and the buildings and streets already established had shaped the town and the survey merely formalised what was already in place. This can still be seen clearly in the irregularity of the major streets. Ravenswood was gazetted as a town in 1871 and such public buildings as a courthouse, a school and a Post Office and Telegraph Station were constructed within the first few years. However, miners began to encounter problems as the gold at deeper levels proved to be finely distributed in ore containing other minerals and was difficult to separate either by mechanical or chemical means. This required greater capital to fund various technologies for extraction. Many miners left for other fields, such as Charters Towers, discovered in 1871 and which quickly overtook Ravenswood as a gold producer and as the most important inland North Queensland town.

Even so, the town continued to prosper, supported by a steady, though reduced, production of gold, the discovery of silver at nearby Totley in 1878 and as a commercial centre. As single miners left, more families moved in and sawn timber buildings replaced the tents and shanties of the early field. The economy of the town was also assisted by the arrival of the Ravenswood branch railway in 1884 and the use of improved means to extract gold from Ravenswood ore. Several key public buildings were replaced in the 1880s, possibly as a government initiative to encourage the development of the town. In 1882 a new Court House and Police Station were built and a new hospital in 1887. The 1873 Post Office was replaced by the current building in 1885.

In 1899, the New Ravenswood Company was formed by Archibald Laurence Wilson who raised overseas capital, reopened old mines and used modern methods to rework tailings more efficiently. The shareholders recouped their investment in the first two years and this drew worldwide interest. It was the beginning of Ravenswood's most prosperous period, which lasted for several years. However, after 1908, the cost of extraction and continued exploration grew as returns lessened and after the end of World War I, it became apparent that it would not pick up again. In 1916 rail services were cut and in 1917 the New Ravenswood Company closed.

In the 1920s, buildings as well as people left Ravenswood, as timber buildings were relocated in other towns. There was a small revival in the 1930s and early 1940s as new technology allowed for economical mining of lower grade ores. Ownership of the Post Office passed from the Australian Government into private hands in 1951, when Frank and Dorothy Weinheimer purchased the building and continued to run it as a post office. However, by the 1960s, the population fell to 70. This was to be its lowest level, as tourists began to take an interest in the town, studies were made of the buildings and work began to conserve them The Post Office was purchased by Warren and Fay Crow in 1975 and to the present owners in 1985. In the 1980s the whole town was listed by the Australian Heritage Commission and the National Trust of Queensland. In 1987 Carpentaria Gold Ltd opened a new open cut mine using modern heap leaching processes.

Throughout Ravenswood's ups and downs, it has continued to provide some government and recreational services to the surrounding community. Postal services have been provided from this site since 1873, and from the current building since 1885. It now also run as a small mixed business selling groceries, fruit and vegetables and other small items is run from the building in conjunction with the postal services. The owners occupy the residence at the rear of the building.

== Description ==
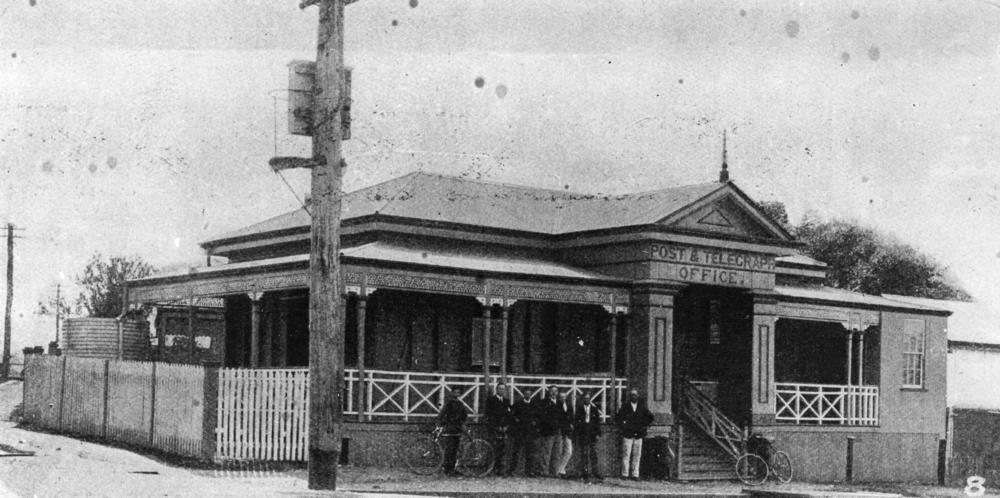
Ravenswood Post Office, 1906

The Post Office and Residence are located at the corner of Raven and Macrossan Streets, close to the bridge over Elphinstone Creek. The town is located in a mining landscape which consists of disturbed ground with scattered ruins and mullock heaps, set amongst distinctive "chinkee apple" trees and rubber vine.

The Post office is a single storey timber building with an exposed stud frame, set on low stumps. It has a hipped, corrugated iron roof and is surrounded on three sides with verandahs supported on paired timber posts. The verandahs have diagonal timber balustrading and a cast iron valance. That on the right hand side is partially enclosed .

The front verandah and entrance to the Post Office and store are reached by steps up to a classically inspired central entrance formed of a triangular timber pediment supported by square timber pillars. The imposing effect created by this entrance is somewhat diminished by the presence of three petrol bowsers in front of the stairs.

The residence at the rear of the Post Office is built of similar materials. It is surrounded by verandahs, has a pyramid roof of corrugated iron and is connected to the Post Office by a short walkway.

== Heritage listing ==
The Ravenswood Post Office was listed on the Queensland Heritage Register on 21 October 1992 having satisfied the following criteria.

The place is important in demonstrating the evolution or pattern of Queensland's history.

Ravenswood is one of the earliest sites associated with major gold mining in North Queensland that gave significant impetus to the economic and social development of the region. The state's encouragement for such growth was demonstrated by the establishment of supporting public infrastructure such as Post and Telegraph Offices. The services so provided were vital in the establishment of isolated towns, particularly when they also had important resources, as Ravenswood did.

The place is important in demonstrating the principal characteristics of a particular class of cultural places.

The buildings are good examples of their type, being erected according to architectural types developed at this time by the Public Works Department, which was instrumental in improving the quality of building design and construction in Queensland.

The place is important because of its aesthetic significance.

The Post Office is well designed and distinctive as an important public building in the town. Its position with a frontage to both Raven and Macrossan Streets makes it a significant feature in the townscape of Ravenswood.
