= Ravenswood School of Arts =

Australian educational building

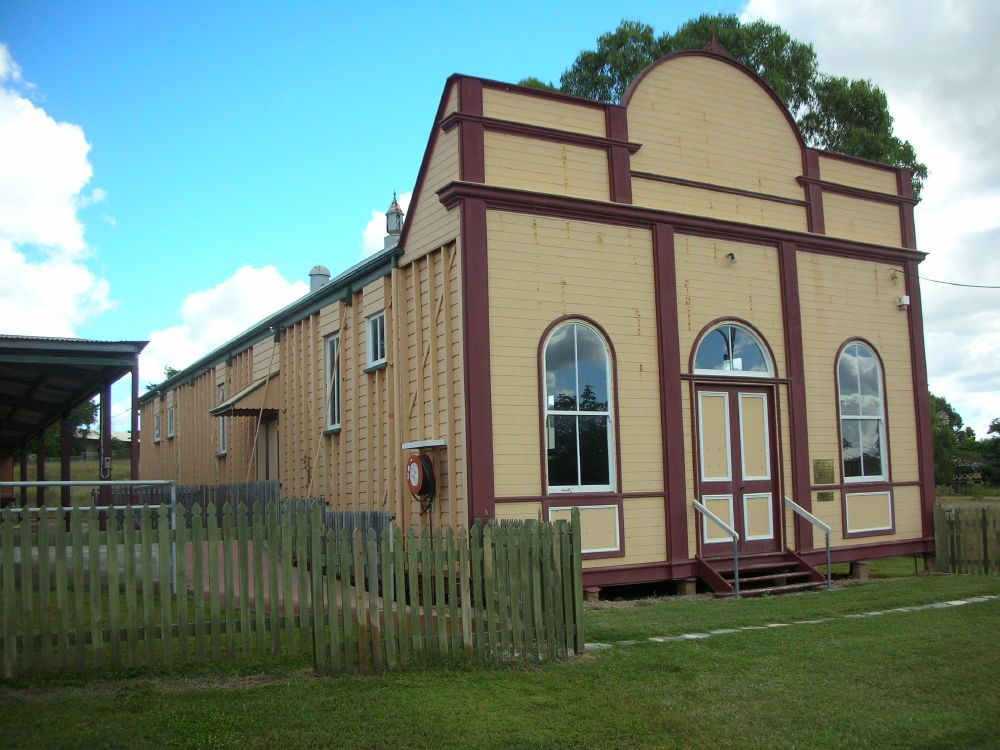
- Ravenswood School of Arts, 2009

- Location within Queensland Location within Australia
- 20.1014°S 146.8901°E
- Location: Macrossan Street, Ravenswood, Charters Towers Region, Queensland, Australia

History
- Design period: 1870s—1890s (late 19th century)
- Built: 1884

Site notes
- Architectural style: Classicism

Queensland Heritage Register
- Official name: Ravenswood School of Arts
- Type: state heritage (built)
- Designated: 21 October 1992
- Reference no.: 600453
- Significant period: 1880s–1920s (historical)
- Significant components: school of arts

Ravenswood School of Arts is a heritage-listed school of arts at Macrossan Street, Ravenswood, Charters Towers Region, Queensland, Australia. It was built in 1884. It was added to the Queensland Heritage Register on 21 October 1992.

== History ==
The School of Arts building is a timber hall, built in 1884 beside a former School of Arts structure then used as a library. It became the principal theatre, cinema, and social venue of Ravenswood and continued a series of facilities provided to the community of Ravenswood since 1872.

Ravenswood was one of several important goldfields in which formed a major component in the development of North Queensland. The need to access and exploit gold finds determined the path of railways, the establishment of related industries and commerce and the location of settlements. Some of these were short lived "rushes", where tent and shanty townships disappeared almost as quickly as they rose. Other settlements based on goldfields became established towns with government and civic buildings, shops and family homes and survived as such. A few became important centres, only to fade away as gold yields fell. Ravenswood was one of these.

The area was first settled by Europeans following the establishment of Bowen in 1861. Pastoral runs were soon set up in the hinterland, including the area on which the Ravenswood field was to develop. The first gold in North Queensland had been found at Star River in 1865 and triggered further exploration. Gold was found at Merri Merriwa, the run on which the town of Ravenswood stands, in 1867, although it was reported as being on the adjoining property of Ravenswood, the name by which the field was always known.

Much of the gold initially found was in a triangle in and around three dry creeks which soon formed the focus for a tent and shanty settlement. Ravenswood gold was in reefs and a small battery was first set up in 1869, followed by the Lady Marian Mill in 1870. The settlement was also surveyed at this time, but by then the goldfield itself, and the buildings and streets already established, had shaped the town and the survey merely formalised what was already in place. This can still be seen clearly in the irregularity of the major streets. Ravenswood was gazetted as a town in 1871.

It was soon found that the gold at deeper levels was finely distributed in ore containing other minerals and was difficult to separate either by mechanical or chemical means. This required greater capital to fund various technologies for extraction. Many miners left for other fields, such as Charters Towers, discovered in 1871 and which quickly overtook Ravenswood as a gold producer and as the most important inland North Queensland town. Even so, Ravenswood continued to prosper due to a steady, though reduced, production of gold, the discovery of silver at nearby Totley in 1878 and as a commercial centre. By 1874, the town had a courthouse and police station, a post and telegraph office, a hospital and a school. In 1872, the first small School of Arts was formed, providing a lending library, newspapers and a meeting place for its members and in 1875 a separate library building was constructed beside it.

The first Mechanics' Institutes or Schools of Arts were established in Britain in the early 1800s and were intended to assist self-improvement and to promote moral, social and intellectual growth, by providing lectures, discussions and lending libraries to a rising middle class. At the time there were no public libraries and books were expensive, so that access to books by borrowing as subscribers provided an important educational and recreational service. The first School of Arts committee in Queensland was established in Brisbane in 1849 with the aim of "the advancement of the community in literary, philosophic and scientific subjects". As towns and districts became established, local committees were formed to establish schools of arts and they became one of the principal sources of adult education.

Ravenswood's economy received a boost in the mid 1880s by the arrival of the railway in 1884 and the use of improved means to extract gold from ore. A new generation of public buildings began to replace those from the early days of the field, including a police station and courthouse, post office and hospital. In 1884, the current hall was built beside the library, presumably replacing the first small hall. In the late nineteenth century Schools of Arts expanded their aims to include the promotion of games of skill and intellectual amusements. The new hall provided the facilities for the staging of plays and concerts and became a focal point of entertainment for townspeople. It was used as a meeting hall, dance hall and a live theatre. An amateur dramatic society staged annual productions and a School concert and St Patrick's Day concert were annual events. . In 1899, the New Ravenswood Company was formed by Archibald Laurence Wilson who raised overseas capital, reopened old mines and used modern methods to rework tailings more efficiently. The shareholders recouped their investment in the first two years and this drew world-wide interest. It was the beginning of Ravenswood's most prosperous period, which lasted for several years. However, after 1908, the cost of extraction and continued exploration grew as returns lessened and after the end of World War I, it became apparent that it would not pick up again. In 1916 rail services were cut and in 1917 the New Ravenswood Company closed.

In the 1920s, buildings as well as people left Ravenswood, as timber buildings were relocated in other towns. There was a small revival in the 1930s and early 1940s as new technology allowed for economical mining of lower grade ores. However, by the 1960s, the population fell to 70. This was to be its lowest level, as tourists began to take an interest in the town, studies were made of the buildings and work began to conserve them. In the 1980s the whole town was listed by the Australian Heritage Commission and the National Trust of Queensland. In 1987 Carpentaria Gold Ltd opened a new open cut mine using modern heap leaching processes.

In 1989 Cyclone Aivu damaged the facade of the hall and caused the complete collapse of the library. This building was propped by the community, but eventually demolished in 1992 as it was thought unsafe. The hall was repaired and the front reconstructed to resemble its original appearance. In 1990 the Dalrymple Shire Council and Carpentaria Gold financed extensive renovations to the hall. Its official opening took place on Sunday 29 September 1991, since when it has again become a focus for community activities and celebrations including the "Back To Ravenswood Weekend" held each year.

== Description ==
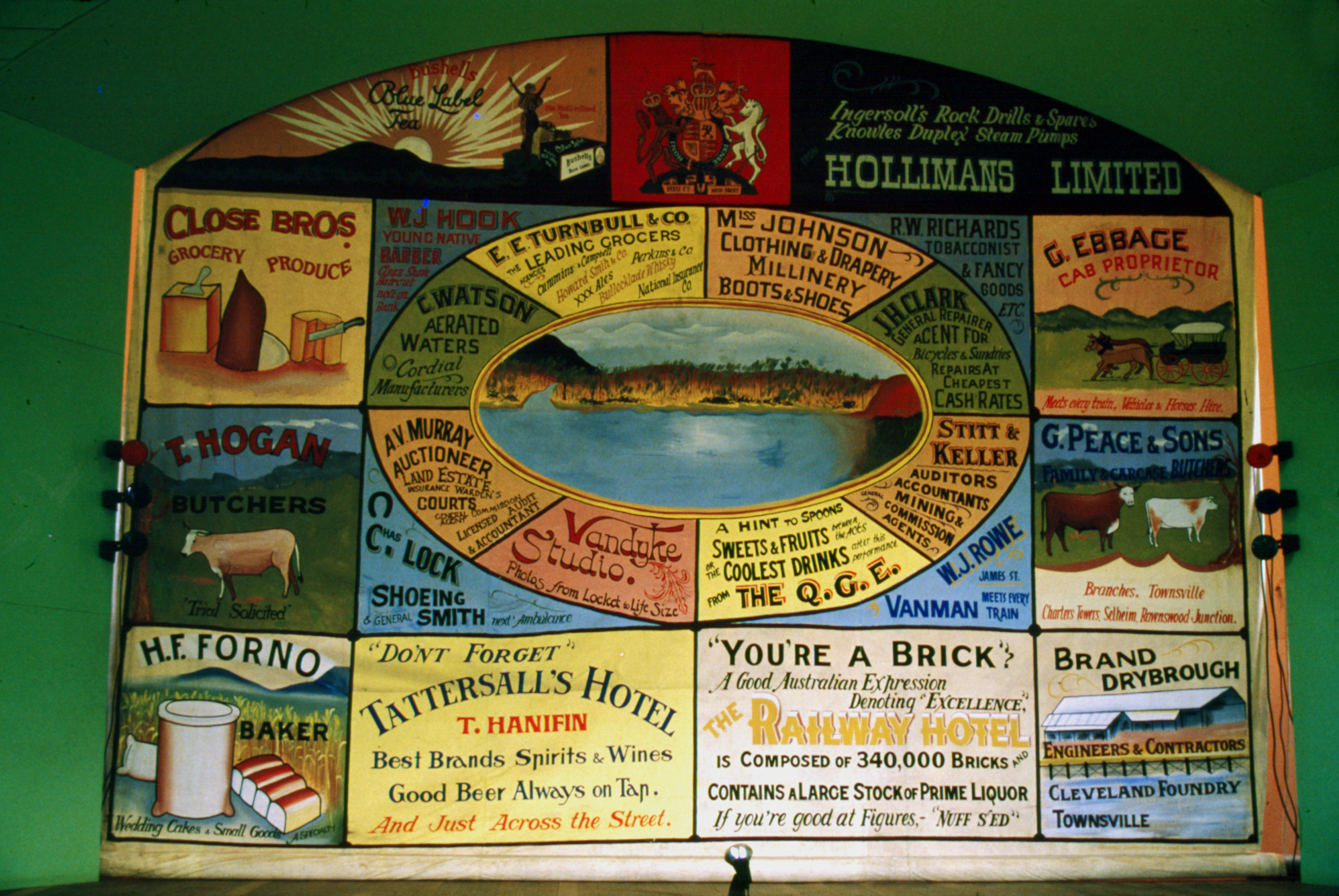
Stage curtain advertising local businesses, 1985

The School of Arts is located on Macrossan Street, the main street of Ravenswood. It is on the edge of the town's commercial centre and close to the Imperial Hotel. Ravenswood is located in a mining landscape which consists of disturbed ground with scattered ruins and mullock heaps, set amongst distinctive chinkee apples and rubber vines.

The School of Arts is a single storey, rectangular timber building set on low concrete stumps. It is rectangular in plan with its long axis at right angles to the street and has a gabled roof clad in corrugated iron. The sides and back have an exposed stud frame but the front is weatherboard clad. The facade is symmetrical and divided into bays by pilasters. The arched parapet is echoed by the arched heads of the central front door and the double hung windows which flank it.

The interior features a large open space and a stage. The stage curtain has been preserved and is decorated with painted advertisements for local businesses dating from around the turn of the century, reflecting its use as a community building.

== Heritage listing ==
Ravenswood School of Arts was listed on the Queensland Heritage Register on 21 October 1992 having satisfied the following criteria.

The place is important in demonstrating the evolution or pattern of Queensland's history.

The Ravenswood School of Arts is important as an element in the network of Schools of Arts which sprang up in any town of consequence in Queensland during the nineteenth and early twentieth centuries. They were community based and played a valuable educational and social role in the dissemination of information and the provision of facilities for lectures, meetings, games of skill and the staging of community events such as plays and concerts.

The place is important in demonstrating the principal characteristics of a particular class of cultural places.

It is a good example of a School of Arts hall with a classically influenced facade and the provision of facilities for public events.

The place is important because of its aesthetic significance.

The building is a significant as part of the townscape of Ravenswood because of its location within a group of other public and commercial buildings, close to the town centre.

The place has a strong or special association with a particular community or cultural group for social, cultural or spiritual reasons.

The painted stage curtain carrying advertisements for local firms around the turn of the century reflects its importance as a building used by the community.

The School of Arts is important for its connection with the community of Ravenswood as an integral part of the social and community life of the town.
