= Imperial Hotel, Ravenswood =

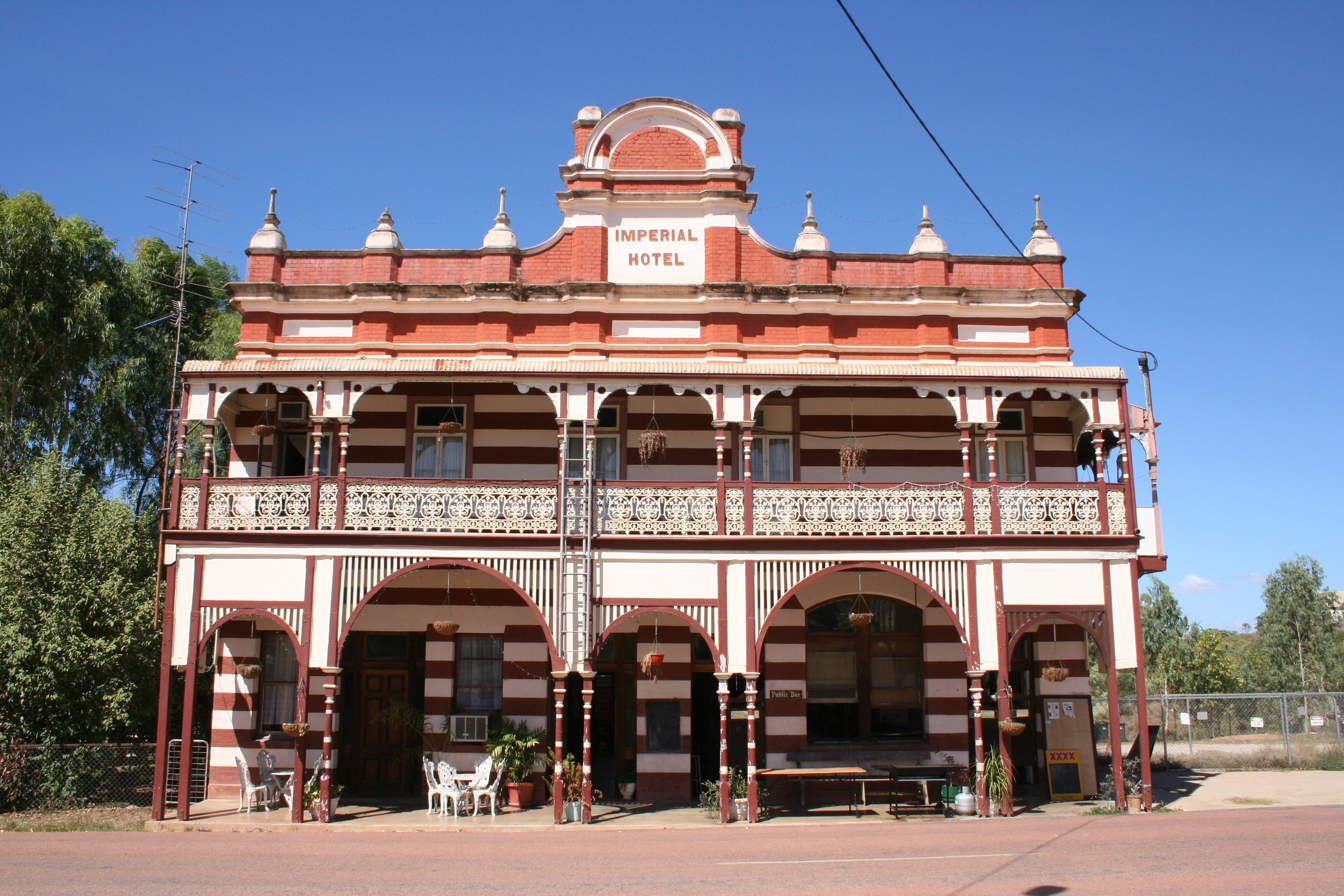
- Imperial Hotel, 2006

- Location within Queensland Location within Australia
- 20.1004°S 146.8901°E
- Location: Macrossan Street, Ravenswood, Charters Towers Region, Queensland, Australia

History
- Design period: 1900–1914 (early 20th century)
- Built: 1901

Site notes
- Architect: Eaton, Bates & Polin
- Architectural style: Federation Filigree

Queensland Heritage Register
- Official name: Imperial Hotel, Ravenswood
- Type: state heritage (built)
- Designated: 21 October 1992
- Reference no.: 600446
- Significant period: 1900s (fabric); 1901–ongoing (historical use)
- Significant components: objects (movable) – retail/wholesale/services, furniture/fittings

Imperial Hotel is a heritage-listed hotel at Macrossan Street, Ravenswood, Charters Towers Region, Queensland, Australia. It was designed by Eaton, Bates & Polin and built in 1901. It was added to the Queensland Heritage Register on 21 October 1992.

== History ==
The Imperial Hotel, a striking two storey brick hotel in the main street of Ravenswood, is one of a handful of buildings which survive from this once important mining town. Constructed in 1901 for James Delaney and run by members of this family for most of the twentieth century, it is evidence of Ravenswood's prosperity during its boom period. The discovery of several important goldfields in Queensland in the nineteenth century formed a major component in the development of North Queensland. The need to access and exploit gold finds determined the path of railways, the establishment of related industries and commerce and the location of settlements. Some of these were short lived "rushes", where tent and shanty townships disappeared almost as quickly as they rose. Other settlements based on goldfields became established towns with government and civic buildings, shops and family homes and survived as such. A few became important centres, only to fade away as gold yields fell. Ravenswood was one of these.

The area was first settled by Europeans following the establishment of Bowen in 1861. Pastoral runs were soon set up in the hinterland, including the area on which the Ravenswood field was to develop. Gold had been found in North Queensland at Star River in 1865 and this triggered further exploration. Gold was found at Merri Merriwa, the run on which the town of Ravenswood stands, in 1867, although it was reported as being on the adjoining property of Ravenswood, the name by which the field was always known. The first claim made was the "Perseverance", later to be known as the "Donnybrook" mine. This has a connection with the Imperial since the success of the mine is said to have provided James Delaney with the capital with which to build the hotel.

Much of the gold initially found was in a triangle in and around three dry creeks which soon formed the focus for a tent and shanty settlement. Ravenswood gold was in reefs and a small battery was first set up in 1869, followed by the Lady Marian Mill in 1870. The settlement was also surveyed at this time, but by then the goldfield itself and the buildings and streets already established had shaped the town and the survey merely formalised what was already in place. This can still be seen clearly in the irregularity of the major streets. Ravenswood was gazetted as a town in 1871 and at this time it had 30 hotels and a population of about 1000.

It was also beginning to have problems as gold at deeper levels proved to be finely distributed in ore containing other minerals and was difficult to separate either by mechanical or chemical means. This required greater capital to fund various technologies for extraction. Many miners left for other fields, such as Charters Towers, discovered in 1871 and which quickly overtook Ravenswood as a gold producer and as the most important inland North Queensland town. Despite this, Ravenswood continued to prosper due to a steady, though reduced, production of gold, the discovery of silver at nearby Totley in 1878 and as a commercial centre. Shanties were replaced by sawn timber buildings and as single miners left, more families moved in. The stability of the town was assisted by linking of Ravenswood to the Great Northern railway from Townsville to Charters Towers in 1884. In this year the Ravenswood Gold Company was formed and experimented with better means to process local ore. In 1899 the New Ravenswood Company was formed by Archibald Laurence Wilson who raised overseas capital, reopened old mines and used modern methods to rework tailings more efficiently. The shareholders recouped their investment in the first two years and this drew worldwide interest. It was the beginning of Ravenswood's most prosperous period.

In 1900 James Delaney applied for a licence for a new 18 bedroom hotel. He had been the licensee of the Commercial Hotel since 1896 when he married Anne Browne, possibly a connection of the owner of the town's most prominent hostelry, Browne's Ravenswood Hotel. The site purchased by Delaney was separated from Browne's by only 2 shops and he opened his splendid two storey Imperial Hotel in early 1901. On the night of 18 April 1901, the Imperial burned to the ground taking with it the whole block of buildings, with the exception of Browne's hotel, which had been protected by a brick wall. The damage was estimated at £20,000. The wall had possibly been erected as a firewall as both the Ravenswood Hotel and the shops Browne owned alongside it were timber, as were virtually all of the buildings in Ravenswood. Closely built timber structures and the lack of an adequate water supply for fire fighting made it possible for fires to race along a block until reaching a gap which acted as a fire break, a fact underlined by a similar fire on the opposite side of the street only three months later. The owners agreed to use the same architect, Eaton, Bates and Polin, to redesign the whole block and tenders were called in early May 1901. The shops between the Ravenswood and the Imperial were replaced by 'Browne's Buildings', Trehearn built a new shop for his former tenant, James Tait & Co. and the bakery and Commercial Hotel, both owned by the Estate of Michael Franzman, were replaced by 3 shops.

Ravenswood had produced bricks since its early years and a team of bricklayers is thought to have already been on the field, brought in by A.L. Wilson to rebuild mining structures such as chimneys. It is said that bricks were brought in from Townsville, but these may have been the cream face bricks applied in bands as a feature of the new buildings and seen to striking effect on the Imperial, which became the centrepiece of two rows of handsome shops.

Delaney died in July 1902 but had already made the hotel over to his wife in 1901. The Delaney's had four daughters, Mary Ellen (1896), Kathleen (1898), Teresa (1899) and Johanna (1901) who at the time of his death were aged between six years and eleven months. In the early years Mrs Delaney appears to have employed a manager, but in 1906 took over the management herself, pending a proposed transfer of the license. In the event, she continued to run the hotel, assisted by her daughters as they grew up.

The population of Ravenswood peaked in 1903 at 4700 but after 1908 the town began to decline. As time went by the cost of extraction grew as returns lessened and Wilson lost money searching for "mother" lodes at deep levels and began to lay off miners. A strike in 1912 dragged out for eight months causing hardship and although judgement eventually favoured the miners, Wilson could no longer afford to employ many of them. The decline of the Ravenswood mines continued with the outbreak of World War I in 1914 increasing costs and disruptions to the labour supply. Buildings began to be sold for removal and in 1916 rail services were cut. In 1917 the New Ravenswood Company closed.

In the 1920s most of the buildings in Ravenswood were moved away, but the Imperial, being a brick building, could not be moved and continued to trade. Ravenswood Shire ceased to exist in 1929 and was absorbed into Dalrymple Shire. In 1930 Ravenswood became the first Queensland town to lose its railway connection. A small revival occurred during the 1930s and a shaft was sunk next to the hotel, but most gold was gained by applying more modern extraction processes to known sites. This did not make much difference to the life of the town and by the 1960s it had reached its lowest ebb with a population of about 70. At this point, tourists began to take an interest in the town, studies were made of the buildings and work began to conserve them. In the 1980s the whole town was listed by the Australian Heritage Commission and the National Trust of Queensland. In 1987 Carpentaria Gold Ltd opened a new open cut mine using modern heap leaching processes.

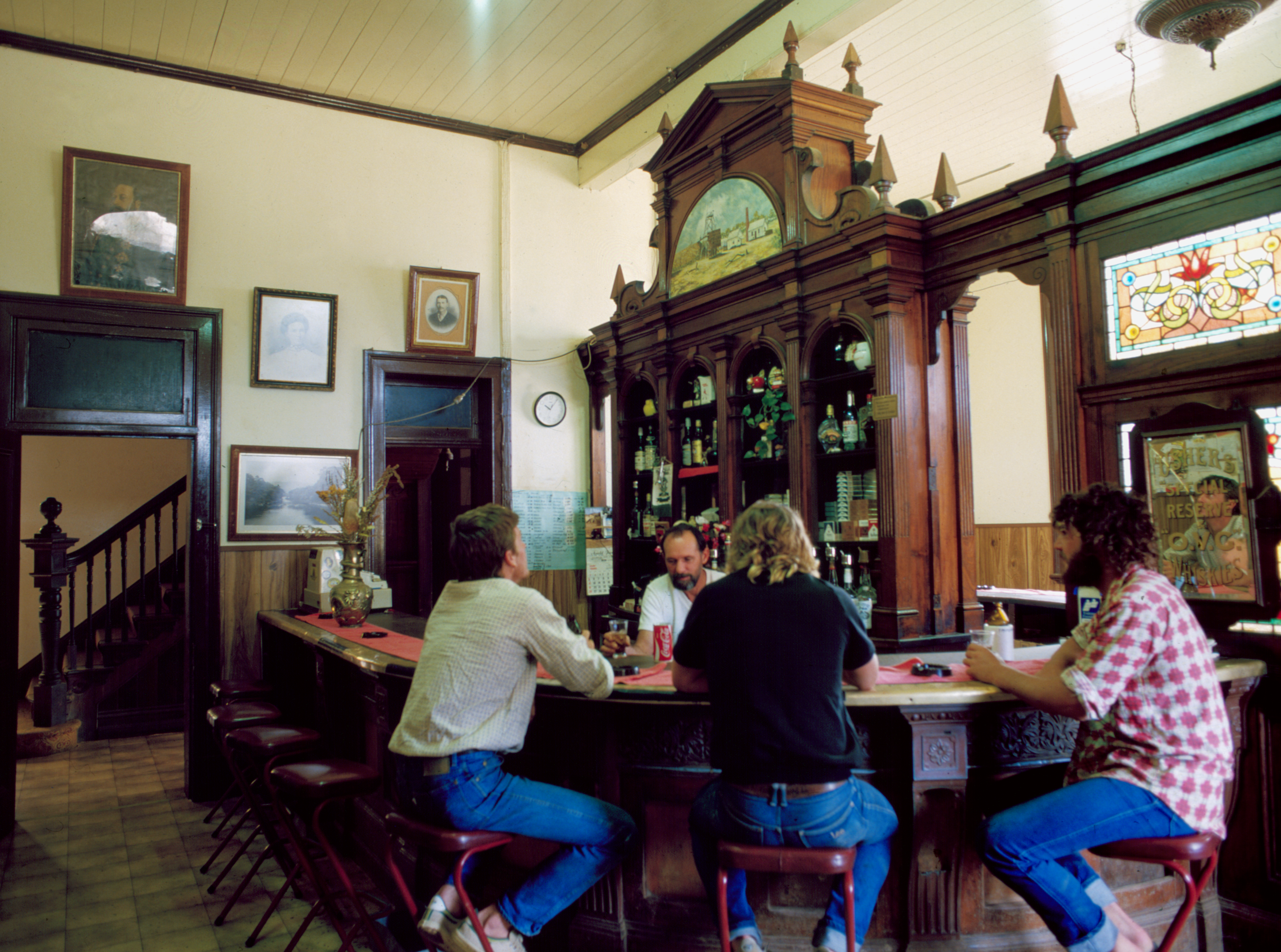
Ornate bar and interior, 1985

Throughout the difficult times in Ravenswood, the hotel continued to trade. Anne Delaney died in 1968 and the hotel was then run by Teresa (Tessa) who died in 1980 and Jo who died in 1989. The hotel then passed to Mary (Maisie), the only married daughter, and her three daughters, Kathleen having died early. In 1994 it was sold to local owners and still operates as a hotel. Ravenswood's two hotels have helped to maintain an economic life in the town and continue to offer accommodation and recreational facilities.

The buildings which flanked the hotel have been demolished, the last bay of Browne's Buildings within recent years, so the hotel now stands alone. The new owners have redecorated some of the bedrooms on the first floor and have removed some of the dining room furniture into storage to create a pool room at the front of the hotel.

== Description ==
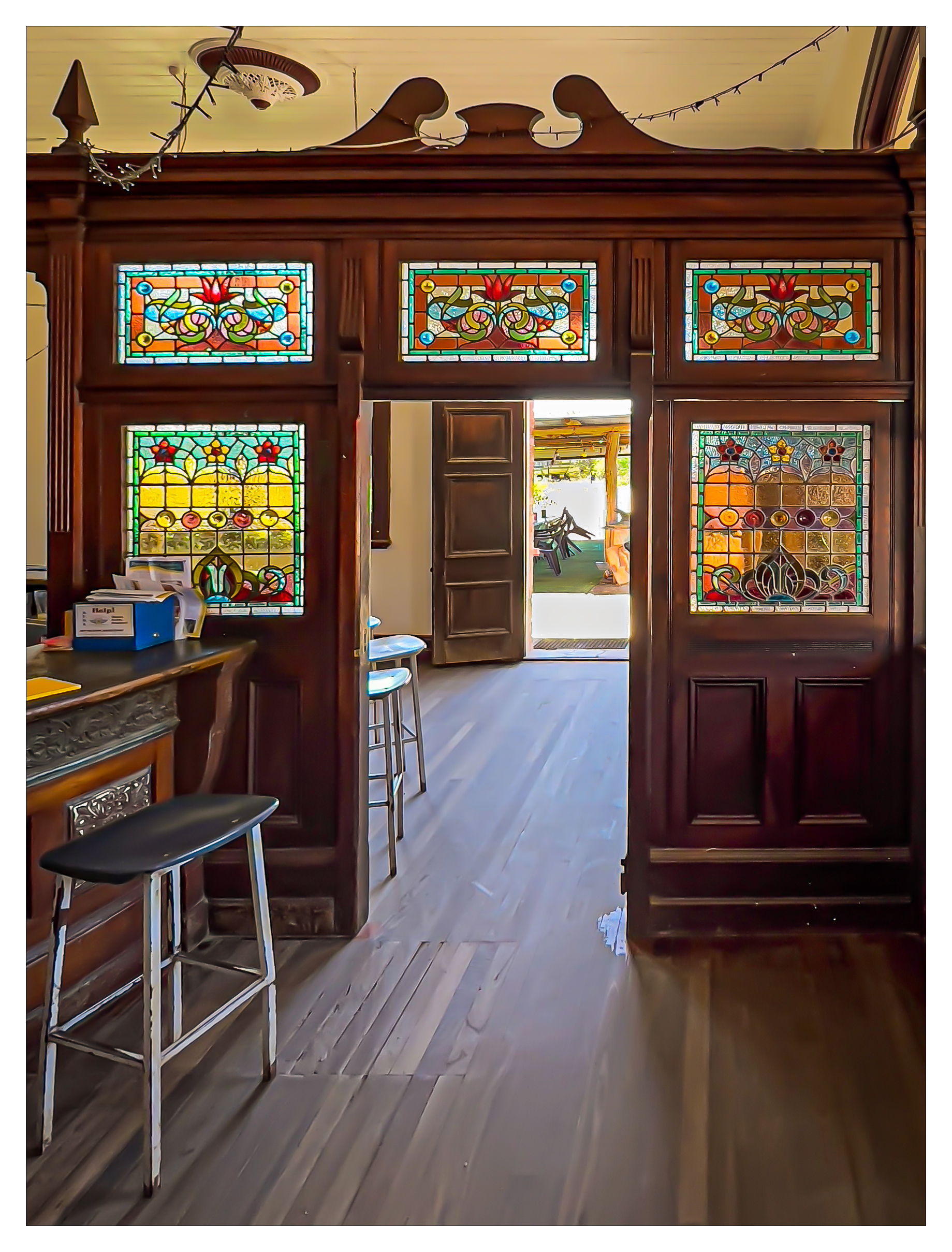
Interior, 2022

The Imperial Hotel is located on Macrossan Street, in the town centre, one of just a few buildings in a landscape of disturbed ground with scattered ruins and mullock heaps, set amongst chinee apple trees and rubber vines. To the rear is Buchanan's Creek, one of those which formed the centre of the field. Originally, there was a laneway to the south of the hotel and this side and the front have elaborate two storey verandahs. In contrast, the northern side is very plain, evidence that another building once adjoined it.

It is a symmetrical two storey building with a U-shaped plan constructed of exposed red brick laid in English bond and decorated with horizontal bands of cream brick at the front. The corrugated iron roof is concealed by a high parapet with a central arched pediment and six flanking spires. The verandah to the street has a corrugated iron roof and is supported by paired posts with fretted timber brackets to the upper storey and a timber valance with arched openings on the ground floor. The upper verandah has panels of cast iron balustrading. The verandah on the side elevation is not connected to this and is to the upper floor only. It has dowel balustrading. There are two front entrances, one to the bar and one to the central hallway. On the upper floor French doors open out from bedrooms on to the verandahs.

The building retains almost all of its original fabric and the interior layout is typical of nineteenth century hotels. It is exceptionally intact down to furniture, fittings and minor items of hotel equipment. The ground floor contains the bars, dining room and furniture and fittings, a billiard room and table, kitchen, store rooms and office. Features include an elaborately constructed and decorated bar with cedar and glass fittings, beer engines and ceramic taps.

A narrow, open court yard extends between the two wings of the building with ground floor toilets at the rear of the kitchen wing. Bedrooms are located on the first floor along with bathroom and toilet facilities. Upstairs the building contains much of its original furniture and fittings.

== Heritage listing ==
The Imperial Hotel in Ravenswood was listed on the Queensland Heritage Register on 21 October 1992 having satisfied the following criteria.

The place is important in demonstrating the evolution or pattern of Queensland's history.

Gold mining has been important in the development of North Queensland and the Imperial Hotel is one of the few buildings remaining from the once important goldfield town of Ravenswood. As an intact and good quality commercial building in what was once the heart of this town, it provides evidence of both the prosperity of the field at the turn of the nineteenth century and of its subsequent decline, illustrating a pattern common on nineteenth century goldfields. The Imperial Hotel has a strong association with James Delaney and with female members of the Delaney family who conducted the hotel for over 90 years.

The place demonstrates rare, uncommon or endangered aspects of Queensland's cultural heritage.

The Imperial Hotel is rare because of the intactness of the building itself and of its interiors, particularly that of the bar, which is not only a fine example of its type, but remains virtually unchanged, highly unusual in a type of building in which constant change and refurbishment is common.

The place has potential to yield information that will contribute to an understanding of Queensland's history.

Because of the preservation of room layout and usage, fittings and furniture, the Imperial Hotel has the potential to yield information that will contribute to our understanding of the operation of a hotel of the Federation era.

The place is important in demonstrating the principal characteristics of a particular class of cultural places.

The Imperial Hotel is important as a good representation of a quality hotel of its era in general form and layout; however, its style and decoration, both inside and out, transcend the typical.

The place is important because of its aesthetic significance.

The Imperial is a fine and exuberant example of Federation hotel architecture and as a substantial two storey building, one of two remaining hotels, is a dominant feature in the town. It is generally the building most admired and photographed by visitors to Ravenswood.
