= Ravenswood Mining Landscape and Chinese Settlement Area =

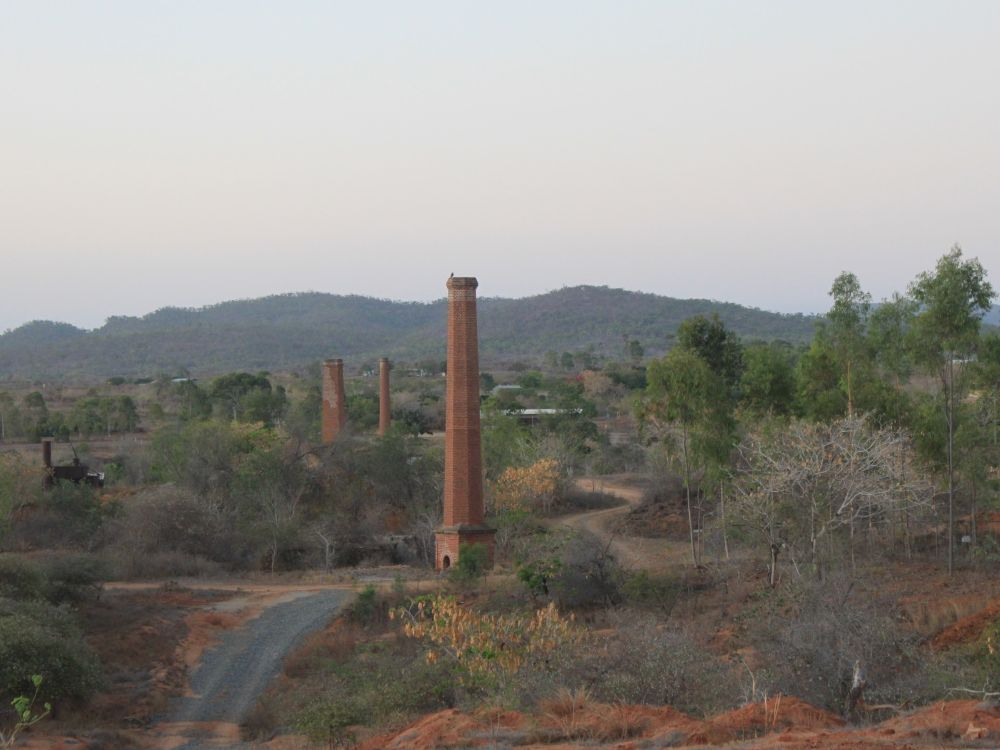
- View across Ravenswood Mining Landscape towards former Sunset No 2 and Grand Junction Mines, from south, 2015

- Location within Queensland
- 20.1031°S 146.8857°E
- Location: Reserve bounded by School Street, Cemetery Road, Railway Street and Burdekin Falls Dam Road, Ravenswood, Charters Towers Region, Queensland, Australia

History
- Design period: 1840s–1860s (mid-19th century)

Queensland Heritage Register
- Official name: Ravenswood Mining Landscape and Chinese Settlement Area
- Type: state heritage
- Designated: 14 October 2016
- Reference no.: 650038
- Type: Archaeological: Archaeological potential; Farming-agriculture/dairying/grazing/horticulture: Market garden; Mining and Mineral Processing: Mill/stamper battery; Mining and Mineral Processing: Mine site; Mining and Mineral Processing: Other – Mining and Mineral Processing; Mining and mineral processing: Mine; Mining and mineral processing: Mining camp/settlement; Mining and mineral processing: Plant-metallurgical/electrolytic; Religion/worship: Temple
- Theme: Exploiting, utilising and transforming the land: Exploiting natural resources; Exploiting, utilising and transforming the land: Experimenting, developing technologies and innovation; Building settlements, towns, cities and dwellings: Establishing settlements and towns

Ravenswood Mining Landscape and Chinese Settlement Area is a heritage-listed former mining town and archaeological site on the reserve bounded by School Street, Cemetery Road, Railway Street and Burdekin Falls Dam Road, Ravenswood, Charters Towers Region, Queensland, Australia. It was added to the Queensland Heritage Register on 14 October 2016.

== History ==
The Ravenswood Mining Landscape and Chinese Settlement Area is situated south of Elphinstone Creek and to the west of School Street and Kerr Street, in the town of Ravenswood, about 85 kilometres (53 mi) south of Townsville and 65 kilometres (40 mi) east of Charters Towers. The Ravenswood goldfield was the fifth largest producer of gold in Queensland during the late 19th and early 20th centuries. Its main mining periods, prior to modern open cut operations (1987 onwards), were: alluvial gold and shallow reef mining (1868–1872); attempts to extract gold from sulphide ores below the water table (c. 1872–1898); the New Ravenswood Company era (1899–1917); and small scale mining and re-treatment of old mullock heaps and tailings dumps (1919–1960s). In 2016 the Ravenswood Mining Landscape and Chinese Settlement Area contains surface structures from eight mines: the Grand Junction, Little Grand Junction, Sunset No.1 and Sunset No.2, Deep, General Grant, Duke of Edinburgh, and Grant and Sunset Extended mines, as well as the mill associated with the Deep mine, and the Mabel Mill tailings treatment plant (most structures dating from the New Ravenswood Company era). It also includes remnants of two treatment plants (Partridge and Ralston's Mill, and Judge's Mill) from the 1930s; and the Chinese settlement area (1870s to the early 20th century, covering the first three mining periods at Ravenswood).

The place contains important surviving evidence of: ore extraction (from underground shafts) and metallurgical extraction (separation of gold from the ore) conducted on and near the Ravenswood goldfield's most productive reefs during the boom period of the town's prosperity (1900–1908); later attempts to re-treat the mullock heaps and tailings dumps from these mines; and Ravenswood's early Chinese community, which made an important contribution to the viability of the isolated settlement and was located along Deighton Street and Elphinstone Creek. The Ravenswood Mining Landscape and Chinese Settlement Area also has the potential to reveal evidence of early alluvial and shallow reef mining, as well as domestic living arrangements on the Ravenswood goldfield. It is an evocative reminder of the precarious and short-lived nature of north Queensland's mining booms, and has a special association with Archibald Lawrence Wilson, who established the New Ravenswood Company and improved both ore and metallurgical extraction processes on the goldfield.

=== Settlement and mining in north Queensland ===
European settlement of the Kennedy Land District in north Queensland commenced with the founding of Bowen in 1861, and the spread of pastoralists through the hinterland. Pastoral stations were established up the valley of the Burdekin River, including "Ravenswood" and "Merri Merriwa". Townsville and Cardwell were both established north of Bowen in 1864.

However, mining, not pastoralism, proved to be the main catalyst for European settlement of north Queensland. In 1865 the founders of Townsville offered a reward for the discovery of a payable goldfield, and gold rushes occurred in the region from 1866. The first rush occurred at the Star River (inland from Townsville) in 1866. This was followed by a rush to the Cape River (near Pentland, southwest of Charters Towers) in 1867. Copper was also found on the Einasleigh River and at Cloncurry in the mid-1860s. Mining employed 19.8% of the north Queensland population in 1868, and 50% by 1876, before dropping to 15% in 1911. Although gold mining attracted people to north Queensland, alluvial finds of gold usually led to temporary townships, whereas underground reef mining held the promise of more stable and permanent settlements.

=== Alluvial gold and shallow reef mining (1868–72) ===
Alluvial gold was discovered south of the later site of Ravenswood, in tributaries of Connolly Creek on Merri Merriwa Station, north of the Burdekin River, in late 1868. One source claims the 1868 find was made by "Messrs Jessop, Buchanan and Party who were afterwards granted the then customary reward". However, another source credits W Crane and Party, who were directed to Connelly Creek by a Mr Curr (Merri Merriwa Station), and found payable gold in Tucker and Hungry Gullies (Creeks), later the site of Middle Camp - while stating that WH Buchanan, JF Jessop and EW Smith later made finds on tributaries of Elphinstone Creek, about April 1869. The Brisbane Courier later noted that Jessop and Party were rewarded £400 for discovering Upper Campwhile Crane and Party, the "original discoverers", only received £100. Prospectors soon established "Middle Camp" (later Donnybrook) on Tucker's Creek, and "Lower Camp" on Trieste Creek, with about 700 miners on the field by early 1869. Further north, in April 1869, the goldfield's richest alluvial discoveries were made in three dry creek beds close to the site of Ravenswood: Nolan's, Jessop's and Buchanan's gullies. Despite these finds, many miners soon left for the rush to the Gilbert River (over 300 kilometres (190 mi) west of Townsville).

The parent reefs of the alluvial gold found in April were located about the same time as the exodus to the Gilbert - the General Grant being discovered first, followed by the Sunset. Both were visible above ground level, and both reefs would play an important part in the future prosperity of Ravenswood. The President Grant reef was one of the first two reefs discovered in 1869, along with the General Grant, but the President Grant is not shown on later maps (1900, 1903) of reefs in the area of the goldfield covered by this heritage recommendation. By 1872, the Sunset reef was the most productive reef on the field, with the General Grant in second place. In the next 40 years, nearly £3 million of gold would come from the reefs "in the little triangle between Buchanan's Gully [just east of Macrossan Street], Jessop's Gully [southwest of the town] and Elphinstone Creek".

Other reefs were soon found north of Elphinstone Creek, and in Nolan's Gully; and meanwhile, reefs had been discovered at Middle Camp. However, a lack of water meant that miners did not establish "Upper Camp" (later Ravenswood) near the General Grant and Sunset reefs until October 1869, after a storm temporarily resolved the water issue. By this time, most miners had returned from the Gilbert. The three camps on the goldfield had a population of 600 by January 1870, most in Upper Camp. Work was slowed by a lack of water, until rains in February 1870 enabled panning and sluicing, the results of which confirmed that Ravenswood was the first significant reef mining goldfield in the northern half of Australia.

However, the miners needed to crush the quartz ore to extract gold. The first machinery for this purpose, WO Hodkinson's five stamp crushing battery, the Lady Marion (or Lady Marian) Mill, was operational at Burnt Point (south of Upper Camp) from 18 April 1870. The first month's crushing results caused "an even greater "rush" than that ... caused by the discovery of the alluvial gold". A second battery was operational in Upper Camp in August 1870, when the goldfield's population was about 1200.

Official recognition of the goldfield and settlement soon followed. The Queensland Government's geologist Richard Daintree visited Upper Camp in August 1870, and the Ravenswood goldfield (about 300 square miles) was proclaimed on 3 November 1870. By this time, the goldfield had a population of about 2000, and Upper Camp had 10 "public houses", with six public houses in Middle Camp.

The Government Surveyor, John von Stieglitz, arrived in November 1870, but was too late to impose a regular grid pattern on the settlement. Instead he formalised the existing plan, which was centred on the crossing of Elphinstone Creek by the main road (Macrossan Street), with tracks radiating out to the various diggings. Most commercial buildings were located along Macrossan Street. The resulting juxtaposition of mining, habitation and commerce gave the town its distinctive character.

The town was proclaimed on 19 May 1871, with an area of one square mile (259ha). This was later expanded to four square miles (1036ha) on 13 July 1883. Although gold had been discovered on Merri Merriwa Station, the name Ravenswood, after the run located further southeast, downstream on the Burdekin River, was preferred.

In 1871 the population of the goldfield was 900, with over half being in Upper Camp/Ravenswood, and by the end of 1871 there were five machines in Ravenswood. Hodgkinson's mill had been moved into town, to a site just north of Elphinstone Creek, and was renamed the Mabel Mill. In 1871 the town had 30 licensed hotels, although these were referred to as "shanties" and did not offer accommodation.

By this time Ravenswood also had a Chinese population, due to an influx of Chinese miners who had been forcefully evicted from the Western Creek diggings near Gilberton in mid-1871. At least three of the hotels of 1871 had Chinese licensees. The first Chinese had arrived in north Queensland in 1867, during the rush to the Cape River, and there were 200 Chinese looking for alluvial gold at Ravenswood in 1871. In January 1872 it was estimated that there were about 1500 Chinese present on the Ravenswood goldfield, and a matching number of Europeans. Later, between 1880 and 1910, the Chinese population varied between 22.7% and 3.9% of the total population of the Ravenswood goldfield. As the Chinese focussed on alluvial gold, and also provided other services, they were tolerated at Ravenswood, because the Europeans were now focusing on reef mining. The quartz reefs were originally worked at shallow depths by means of a windlass (hand-wound rope and bucket), or a horse-powered whip or whim (using poles, ropes and pulleys) raising the ore from shallow shafts.

=== Extracting gold from sulphide ores (c. 1872–98) ===
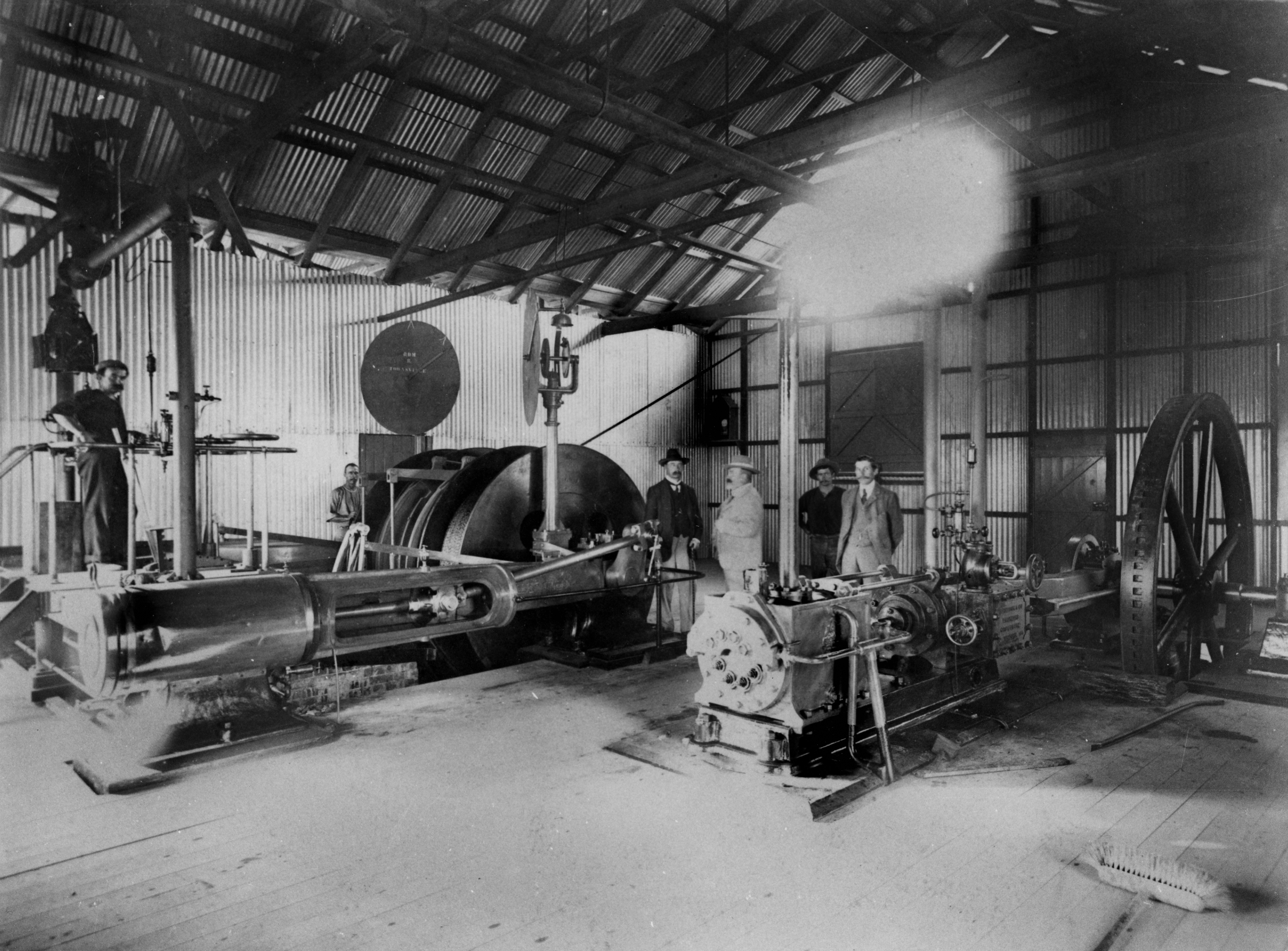
Power plant at the Ravenswood Deep Mines Ltd., Queensland, ca. 1898

Despite its promising start, in 1872 the Ravenswood goldfield entered a "period of depression", as its most important mines reached the water table at about 70 feet (21 m) deep - starting with the Sunset in 1871, followed by the General Grant, Black Jack, and Melaneur in 1872. Although the oxidised quartz ('red stone' or "brown stone" quartz) close to the surface yielded its gold to traditional methods of mechanical crushing, below the water table the gold was in fine particles, which was not easily recovered by mechanical means. It was also mixed with sulphide ores; mainly iron sulphide (pyrite, or "mundic" ore) but also sulphides containing lead, copper, zinc, arsenic and antimony, which interfered with chemical treatments such as amalgamation (amalgamating the gold with mercury; then heating the resulting amalgam in a retort to vaporise the mercury) and chlorination (exposing roasted, concentrated ore to chlorine gas, and then precipitating gold out of the chloride solution). A process that worked on the ore from one reef might not work for an adjacent reef, due to a varying distribution of different types of sulphides. In addition, even if a process worked on a small scale, it could be uneconomical on a larger scale, given the price of transporting fuel to Ravenswood for smelting, or transporting concentrates for smelting elsewhere.

Once the mundic had been struck, "mining was 'worse than dull' as the field grappled with the realisation that to break below the waterline, the days of the individual miner were over and the time of companies was looming". The 1870s was a decade of major gold discoveries

in Queensland, and miners keen on quick profits had plenty of new goldfields from which to choose. Many miners joined the rushes to Charters Towers (1872) and the Palmer River (1873). Many Chinese departed from Ravenswood for the Palmer River. Charters Towers soon overtook Ravenswood as the most important inland town in north Queensland; and the Hodgkinson rush (southwest of Port Douglas) in 1876 also drew away miners.

However, Ravenswood grew during the 1870s and 1880s, despite the goldfield's "refractory" ores, and "mundic problem". The goldfield had a population of 950 in 1877 (with 50 Chinese), rising to 1100 in 1880 (including 250 Chinese), and 2000 in 1883 (including 300 Chinese; with 190 working the alluvial, and 10 quartz miners). In 1877 there were 25 Chinese working as alluvial miners on the Ravenswood goldfield, along with 400 European quartz (reef) miners - out of a total of 13,269 Chinese and 4,634 European gold miners in Queensland. 13,000 of those Chinese miners were on the Palmer River goldfield, but that year it was also reported that up to 200 Chinese had arrived in Ravenswood from the Palmer, Cooktown and other northern towns.

The 1877 Pugh's Almanac listed one Chinese hotelkeeper (out of seven hotelkeepers) in Ravenswood, and one Chinese storekeeper. The Chinese, as well as working alluvial claims and operating hotels and stores, were employed as wage labour in some mines; worked as roasters and chlorinators at the Mabel Mill; and operated 24 licensed market gardens on the Ravenswood goldfield in 1883. There were 27 gardens altogether, with a total area of 82 acres. By 1885 there were 37 gardens, all operated by Chinese, with an area of 105 acres. Chinese gardens were vital in providing fresh vegetables to north Queensland's goldfield populations.

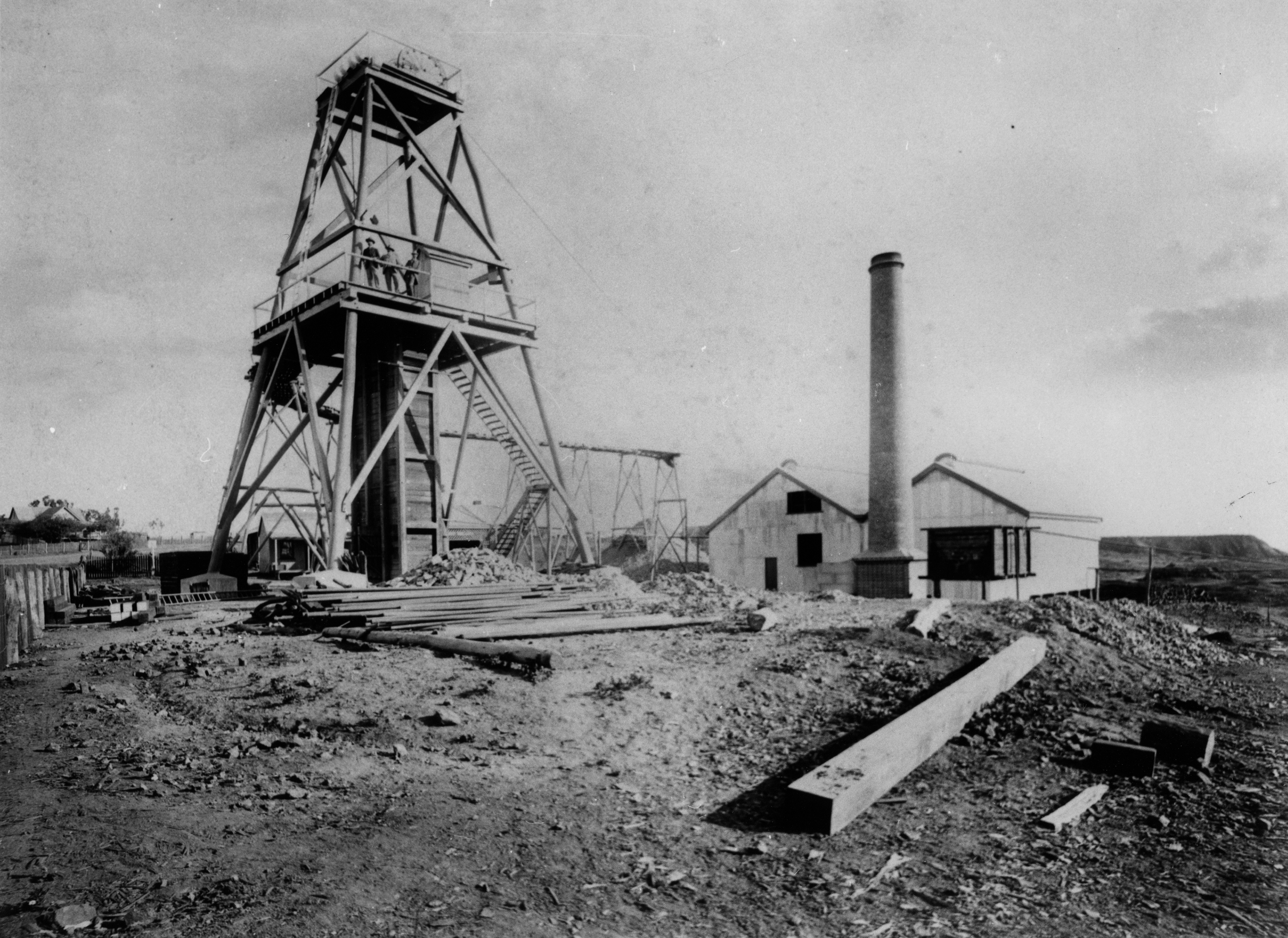
Ravenswood Deep Mines Ltd., Queensland, ca. 1898

For 19th century diasporic Chinese communities such as Ravenswood's, the establishment of specific cultural settlement areas, or "Chinatowns", that "provided a range of sacred and secular services, including temples, stores and accommodation", was an important aspect of community building. Deighton Street, west of Macrossan Street, was the centre of Chinese life in Ravenswood. There were two eating houses close to Macrossan Street's bridge across Elphinstone Creek, in the 1870s; and market gardens were located between Deighton Street and Elphinstone Creek, as well as north of Elphinstone Creek, interspersed amongst several crushing machine operations. There was also a temple south of Deighton Street. Temples were not just places of religious worship; rather, they were an integral part of a Chinese village. "They were places to meet, to check one's horoscope before embarking on a new venture and places where ancestors were venerated." As well as being a place where the community could worship at any time, major gatherings were held at temples on festival days, with feasts and processions. The Ravenswood temple appears on an 1874 survey plan, making it the earliest known Chinese temple in Queensland. Temples were later built at towns including: Cooktown (1877), The Palmer (c.1878), Port Douglas (c. 1880s), Cairns (1886), Breakfast Creek in Brisbane (1886), Etheridge/Georgetown (1891), Croydon (1897), and Atherton (1903). The nearby pig roasting oven is also a rare example of its type, and demonstrates the usual spatial arrangement of temple and oven, for community feasts. Another example of a pig oven is found at Croydon, while the site of a pig oven is visible in Atherton. It has been suggested that Chinese pig ovens may be a phenomenon only found in Chinese migrant communities in Australia and New Zealand and may reflect practices from specific localities in China.

Ravenswood continued to develop during the 1880s. By 1885, the Ravenswood goldfield had an estimated population of 2294 Europeans and 227 Chinese, with 1490 Europeans and 148 Chinese located in Ravenswood itself. Ravenswood at this time had four Chinese storekeepers, and two Chinese produce merchants, but all six hotel licensees were European. The Ravenswood National School, which opened in temporary buildings in late 1873, and in its own buildings in 1874. had an average attendance of 110 students in 1878, and reached its peak enrolment of 390 by 1889.

The 1880s were also a period of experimentation in metallurgical (gold extraction) technology. In 1883, the only method for dealing with sulphide ores was stamper mills and rotary buddles (which used water and gravity to separate and concentrate the crushed ores), but later Ravenswood "was the first place where the chlorination process and Wilfley tables [developed 1896, to shake the ore and separate out different sized particles] were used in Queensland, and probably the first place where the cyanide process [dissolving fine gold in a cyanide solution, and later precipitating the gold out of the solution] for extracting gold was used in Australia". Other techniques attempted included fine grinding (using ball mills), roasting (burning off the sulphides), and smelting (prohibitively expensive, as it required high temperatures and thus a lot of fuel). By 1888 a new company at One Mile Creek, formed by Duncan and Peter Macintyre, had adapted an abandoned Cassell's patent plant (a version of the chlorination process which was applied and failed in Ravenswood in 1886), to work on a "secret process" (cyaniding).

Ravenswood mining continued to be viable, although only a (fluctuating) percentage of the gold was being recovered from the ore. In the mid-1880s there was even a temporary increase in the goldfield's production, due to good returns from the Sandy Creek mines on the John Bull reef. For the next eight years, the principal producers of the district were the General Grant, Sunset, New England, Wild Irish Girl, Melaneur and John Bull reefs, plus the silver lodes of the One Mile (at Totley).

Ravenswood's economy survived the 1880s due to the development of silver mines at Totley Township established about 2 kilometres (1.2 mi) north of Ravenswood. The silver mines opened c. 1879-80, and Richard King floated the Ravenswood Silver Mining Company Ltd in 1882 - the year of Ravenswood's lowest gold production between 1878 and 1898. Silver prices were high during the 1880s, and the Totley mines encouraged the Queensland Government to approve a branch railway line (off the Northern Railway between Townsville and Charters Towers) to Ravenswood in 1882 (completed 1884). The railway meant that some gold ores could be crushed, concentrated and sent for treatment at the Aldershot works just north of Maryborough or overseas to Swansea, in Wales. However, all silver mining had stopped by 1891, due to falling silver prices and over-expenditure on treatment plants.

Gold mining at Ravenswood continued during the 1880s and 1890s. Hugh Hawthorne Barton, who had operated Brothers Mill on Elphinstone Creek from the late 1870s, took over the General Grant, Sunset and Black Jack mines, and the Mabel Mill (and later the Melaneur and Duke of Edinburgh mines), and floated the Ravenswood Gold Mining Company in 1887, with £100,000 in capital. The General Grant, Sunset and Black Jack mines, and the Mabel Mill had previously been operated by the Ravenswood Gold Smelting Company, floated in London in 1884. This company utilised Chinese workers to hand pick ore prior to processing. From 1884 to 1896 Barton's group was the largest and most successful operation in Ravenswood, its profitability assisted by the railway, economies of scale, and flexibility in ore-treatment methods. Barton utilised roasting, chlorination (by 1889), and smelting, and employed Chinese workers at the Mabel Mill. Along with their market gardens along Elphinstone Creek, Chinese employment at the Mabel Mill also influenced the location of the Chinese settlement area in Ravenswood. Meanwhile, the landscape was being altered by mining. The need for timber for boilers and for timbering-up mine shafts led to the loss of native trees in the locality, and goats also helped shape the landscape by eating regrowth.

By the mid-1890s, Barton was in debt to the Queensland National Bank, and his properties were seized in 1896, with the General Grant, Black Jack and Mabel Mill being let on tribute (where a party of miners worked a mine, while giving the mine owner a percentage of any results) in 1897. The tributers refused to employ Barton's experienced Chinese workers at the Mabel Mill, leading to disastrous attempts at chlorination. However, the goldfield's production was boosted in the late 1890s when work resumed on the Donnybrook reefs for the first time in 20 years, and the Hillsborough (Eight Mile) reefs were taken up.

=== The New Ravenswood Company era (1899–1917) ===
Ravenswood's boom period of gold production (c. 1900–1908, with 1905 the year of highest production) is reflected in the town's surviving mining infrastructure and commercial and public buildings. This boom occurred due to the efforts of Archibald Laurence Wilson (1852–1935). After gaining a diploma in mining engineering in Edinburgh, and working in New Zealand and on the Palmer River, Wilson arrived in Ravenswood in 1878. He was publican of the Silver King Hotel in Totley in the 1880s. As manager of the John Bull mine at Sandy Creek in the mid-1890s, he raised capital in London and installed a cyanide plant.

Wilson later travelled to London in 1898, where he floated both the Donnybrook Blocks Mining Syndicate and the New Ravenswood Company in 1899. Wilson was the general manager of both companies, under their London directorates. Until 1917, the New Ravenswood Company was the largest mining operation on the Ravenswood goldfield. Registered with a capital of £50,000, the company purchased the General Grant, Sunset, Black Jack, Melaneur, and Shelmalier mines, and the Mabel Mill, from the Queensland National Bank (and later obtained the Saratoga, Duke of Edinburgh and London North mines), and initiated a new era in ore and metallurgical extraction. Using British capital, Wilson introduced modern machinery to work the mines, and effectively reshaped Ravenswood's landscape. Wilson was known as "the uncrowned king of Ravenswood". He was also Chairman of the Ravenswood Shire Council for some years, and was later on the Dalrymple Shire Council, until he resigned from poor health in 1934.

From 1900, both the Sunset and General Grant (also known as the Grant) mines were redeveloped by Wilson. These became the key earners for the New Ravenswood Company; by 1903 the two mines employed about 205 men, and were "the "backbone" of [the] town".

The Sunset reef, which runs roughly northwest-southeast through the Ravenswood Mining Landscape, was the largest producer on the goldfield (almost a quarter of the total). It produced 14,722oz of gold from 1870 to 1894, and by 1900 it was worked from an underlie (an inclined shaft, following the dip of a reef) branching off from a vertical shaft 130 feet (40 m) deep. It was stated at this time that the reef had "much the same history as the General Grant, the two being generally worked together". By 1903 the New Ravenswood Company had extended the underlie shaft right up to the surface, where a headframe was constructed to haul ore directly up the slope. The Sunset's yield of "free gold" (pure gold not combined with other minerals), which could be extracted at the Mabel Mill, peaked in 1904, then fell slowly. In 1905 an average of 170 men were employed at the mine. In 1908 the reef was being worked by the main underlie shaft, 900 feet (270 m) deep (Sunset No.1); and a vertical shaft, 556 feet (169 m) deep (Sunset No.2). As the Sunset reef was worked in conjunction with the General Grant and the Duke of Edinburgh reefs in the New Ravenswood Company era, its exact total production of gold is hard to calculate; but from 1876 to 1912 the reef probably produced about 177,000oz of gold; and probably most of the 22,000oz that the company extracted from 1912 to 1917.

The General Grant, one of the most productive reefs on the goldfield, running roughly north-south just east of the Sunset reef, was worked almost continuously to the late 1880s, and periodically thereafter. By 1895 returns had diminished, due to the small size of the reef and its highly refractory ore. In 1900, the General Grant had a vertical shaft to 110 feet (34 m), and then an underlie of 610 feet (190 m), the bottom of the latter being 450 feet (140 m) below the level of the shaft mouth; but operations were "almost completely suspended" as the New Ravenswood Company concentrated on the Sunset reef. The underlie was 850 feet (260 m) long by 1908. To 1900 the General Grant had produced 23,651oz of gold; and after crushing of ore from the mine resumed at the beginning of 1903, it was treated with ore from the Sunset. On average, 40 men were employed on the mine in 1905. In 1908 the power house for both the Sunset and the General Grant mines was situated on the General Grant lease, with three Cornish boilers. By 1912 the General Grant had produced about 36,000oz of gold.

To the east of the General Grant was the Duke of Edinburgh reef, running roughly northwest-southeast. This was one of the early reefs discovered on the goldfield; and in 1872 it was identified by Warden TR Hackett as one of the 28 principal reefs. The Duke of Edinburgh was a prospecting claim by 1870. It was worked in several episodes prior to the 1890s, and was re-opened in 1891, producing 1286oz of gold during 1891–95. In 1908 the mine was taken over by the New Ravenswood Company, and was reorganised as an underlie shaft with haulage machinery from the Golden Hill mine, being worked in conjunction with the General Grant until 1917.

Along with his modernisation of the goldfield's best mines, Wilson also abandoned chlorination at the Mabel Mill, increased the mill's crushing capacity to 30 stamps (by 1904), and introduced the first Wilfley tables to Queensland. Crushing resumed in January 1900. Wilson improved metallurgical extraction by "postponing amalgamation of the free gold till the great bulk of the sulphides [had] been removed by concentration". The ore was crushed in stampers without using mercury. Then, using the Wilfley tables, the heavier Galena (lead sulphide ore) and free gold was separated from the lighter sulphides. The free gold and galena was then ground in Berdan pans with mercury, while the remaining sulphides (containing iron, zinc and copper) were dispatched to the Aldershot works (near Maryborough) for smelting. In 1902–3, a raff wheel, 14.5 metres (48 ft) in diameter, was built at the Mabel Mill to lift tailings (post-treatment residue) up to a flume, which carried them over to the south side of Elphinstone Creek, where they could be treated with cyanide. The cyanide works (of which remnants still remain south of Elphinstone Creek) was erected c. 1904. The cyanide works were not erected by September 1903, but there is a reference to a "second treatment works" at the New Ravenswood mill in 1904. The new treatment works was expected to begin work in October 1904. A 21-metre (69 ft) long girder bridge was constructed across the creek to carry steam water pipes and electric cable from the Mabel Mill to the new works, which eventually comprised two Krupp ball mills and 12 tables.

Due to the New Ravenswood Company's efforts, the goldfield's production increased between 1899 and 1905. Gold recovery increased from 18,016oz in 1899 to 24,832oz in 1900 and to 42,465oz in 1905. The New Ravenswood Company paid impressive 50% dividends to its shareholders in 1901, 1902 and 1904; and 75% in 1903.

The productivity of Ravenswood's mines during the New Ravenswood Company era was also reflected in the goldfield's population, which rose from 3420 in 1901 to its peak of 4707 in 1903. The 1903 population included 215 Chinese, 89 of these being alluvial miners. Although these figures are given for the "Ravenswood Gold Field and Mining Districts", a figure of 1862, from the 1901 census, was given as the population of the town of Ravenswood. In 1905 two Chinese were listed as "storekeepers and grocers".

The population increase led to a building boom in the first decade of the 20th century. Hundreds of new houses, the town's first two brick hotels – the Imperial Hotel and the Railway Hotel (c. 1902) – as well as brick shops such as Thorp's Building (1903), and the brick Ravenswood Ambulance Station (1904) were constructed in this period; the use of brick being spurred by the threat of fire. The New Ravenswood Company also rebuilt the mining landscape in and around the town, with expansion of the Mabel Mill, and new headframes and winders, magazines, boilers and brick smokestacks erected beside all the principal shafts.

However, not all Wilson's ventures in this period were successful. In 1902 he floated Deep Mines Ltd, with a capital of £100,000, to sink a shaft east of the New Ravenswood Company's leases. This mine (also within the Ravenswood Mining Landscape) was an ambitious attempt to reach a presumed intersection of the General Grant and Sunset reefs at depth. Using the capital raised, Wilson built a model mine and mill. The shaft was started in late 1902-early 1903, and construction work on the buildings and machinery was completed later in 1903. The mine reached 512 metres (1,680 ft), the deepest on the goldfield, with extensive crosscutting and driving, but only about 240oz of gold was recovered. No ore was crushed at all in 1908. By 1910 a new shaft was being sunk "near the western boundary"; but the mine was abandoned in 1911, and never worked again. Wilson's London investors lost at least £65,000.

The Deep's mill, built nearby and operational by 1906, was a smaller version of the Mabel Mill, with gravity stamps, Wilfley tables, and a cyanide plant. Its site, adjacent to the mine, ran counter to the normal practice of siting mills near water courses. With the failure of the Deep mine, it milled ore from other mines until about 1917.

Another mine, the Grand Junction, was located north of the New Ravenswood Company's most productive mines, in the Ravenswood Mining Landscape. The Grand Junction Consolidated Gold Mining Company was formed in 1900, and a shaft was sunk in 1901 (probably the No.1 shaft on the Grand Junction Lease No.520). In 1902 another exploration "deep shaft" (No.2) was sunk at the southwest boundary of the Grand Junction Lease No.503. A 1903 map shows No.2 shaft was on the southwest boundary of the Grand Junction holding, and No.1 shaft was in the eastern half of the holding. The Grand Junction mine was another failed attempt to locate a presumed junction of the General Grant and Sunset reefs at depth; by 1908 it was owned by the New Ravenswood Company. The mine was apparently closed by 1906. Total production was about 425oz of gold.

Slightly more successful was the Grant and Sunset Extended mine, at the southern end of the Ravenswood Mining landscape. This was a deep shaft sunk by the Grant and Sunset Extended Gold Mining Company, a Charters Towers-owned company with Wilson as its local director. During the 19th century, small mines had been operated in the Rob Roy reef, to the southeast. The Grant and Sunset Extended was floated in 1902, the intent being to locate the General Grant and Sunset reefs south of Buck Reef. The plant and buildings of the Yellow Jack mine, southeast of Ravenswood, were re-erected on the site. The shaft was down 70 feet (21 m) in 1,902 and 930 feet (580 and 283 m) by 1908, with 50 men employed at the mine by the later date. The mine closed by 1910, but was worked on tribute until 1917, with about 15,000oz of gold obtained over 1904–18. The mine was worked on tribute by James Judge and party until at least 1911.

The boom period at Ravenswood did not last. As well as losing money on the Deep and Grand Junction mines, the New Ravenswood Company faced the closure of the Aldershot works in 1906, and declining yields from 1908 to 1912. Although Wilson experimented with flotation (agitating crushed ore in oil and water, and extracting fine gold particles on the surface of air bubbles) and cyanide processes at the Mabel Mill, it was too late to save his company. The Shelmalier had closed by 1904, the Black Jack in 1909, and the Melaneur in 1910. By that year, the General Grant, Sunset, Duke of Edinburgh and London North (obtained 1910) were the New Ravenswood Company's only producing mines.

Few new buildings were constructed in Ravenswood after 1905. The hospital closed in 1908. That year the goldfield's population consisted of 4141 Europeans (including 2625 women and children) and 181 Chinese (including 94 alluvial miners). This dropped to 2581, including 92 Chinese, by 1914. A 1913 list of 52 Chinese men, women and children in Ravenswood included two housewives, seven children, 22 fossickers, 10 gardeners, 4 carters, 3 bakers, 2 storekeepers, and one each of a cook and bookkeeper.

Increased costs and industrial disputes in the 1910s hastened the end of the New Ravenswood Company era. During a miner's strike between December 1912 and July 1913, over lay-offs, the fresh vegetables and business loans provided by Ravenswood's Chinese community helped keep the town going. Although the miners won, it was a hollow victory, as the company could only afford to re-employ a few of the men. World War I (1914–18) then increased labour and material costs for the New Ravenswood Company. The London North mine closed in 1915, and on 24 March 1917 the New Ravenswood Company ceased operations; ending large-scale mining in Ravenswood for the next 70 years.

By 1917, the Ravenswood goldfield had produced over 850,000oz of gold (nearly a quarter coming from the Sunset mine), and 1,000,000oz of silver. According to a table on Ravenswood's gold production, total production to 1917 inclusive was 865,054oz of gold (154,094oz to the end of 1877 and 254,213oz from 1878 to 1899 and 456,747oz from 1900 to 1917, making it the fifth largest gold producer in Queensland, after Charters Towers, Mount Morgan, Gympie and the Palmer goldfield. Ravenswood was also the second largest producer of reef gold in north Queensland, after Charters Towers. By the end of 1928 Ravenswood had produced 885,805oz by comparison, production at Charters Towers and the Cape River field by this time was 6,673,398oz, Rockhampton and Mount Morgan: 5,099,570oz, Gympie: 3,388,855oz, and the Palmer: 1,329,666oz. The next biggest producer after Ravenswood was Croydon, at 770,947oz. Other goldfield production included: Eidsvold: 97,742oz, Etheridge, Oaks and Woolgar: 627,481oz<, Hamilton: 46,050oz, Hodgkinson (to end of 1908, then included in Chillagoe): 229,706oz, Chillagoe (from 1909) 36,825oz<, Mount Coolon: 35,156oz< and a total from Cloncurry, Calliope, Clermont, Paradise, Normanby and other small fields of 844,476oz.

=== Small scale mining and re-treatment (1919–60s) ===
After 1917 the Ravenswood goldfield entered a period of hibernation, with intermittent small-scale attempts at mining. In 1919, Ravenswood Gold Mines Ltd took over some of Wilson's leases and renovated the Deep mine's mill, but obtained poor returns. In 1922, 680 tons of material was gathered up at the Deep's mill site, and was reduced locally to 16 tons of concentrates, worth £594. Ravenswood Gold Mines also worked the Duke of Edinburgh from c. 1919 to 1930, with good returns reported in 1924. Ravenswood Gold Mines worked the Duke of Edinburgh from that mine's underlie, and the No.4 Grant shaft. The General Grant and Sunset were also worked on a small scale from 1919–21, while the Mabel Mill continued to provide crushing services for the limited local mining.

Consequently, Ravenswood's population declined and the town shrank physically. In 1921 the town's population fell below 1000, and by 1923 there were 530 people left, including 8 Chinese. Pugh's Almanacs for 1923 and 1927 list a population of 1800 for Ravenswood, yet by 1925, there were only about 609 people in the whole district, including 5 Chinese. During the 1920s, prior to the closure of the railway branch line to Ravenswood in 1930. Ravenswood was the first Queensland town to lose its railway with hundreds of the town's timber buildings were dismantled and railed away. By 1927, only the two brick hotels remained operating as hotels. The Ravenswood Shire was absorbed into the Shire of Dalrymple in 1929, and by 1934 only 357 people remained in the town. In 1935, the population was 451 - presumably for the whole goldfield.

Despite this decline, some gold was still being extracted. There was a small increase in gold production between 1923 and 1927. A total of 16,130oz was produced in 1938. The Duke of Edinburgh was the largest producer on the field in 1927, and due to the gold price rise of the 1930s, some mines were re-worked and efforts were also made to treat the old mullock heaps (waste rock from mining) and tailings dumps with improved cyanide processes. Between 1931 and 1942, 12,253oz of gold was obtained from the goldfield, the peak year being 1940.

A number of companies were active in Ravenswood in the 1930s-early 1940s. In 1933, the North Queensland Gold Mining Development Company took up leases along Buck Reef and reopened the Golden Hill mine, and the following year their operations were taken over by Gold Mines of Australia Ltd. The 1870s Eureka mine (near the Imperial Hotel) was revived by James Judge in 1934. In 1935 the Ravenswood Concentrates Syndicate began re-treating the Grant mullock heaps in the remaining stampers at the Mabel Mill, and dewatering the Sunset No.2 shaft; while the Sunset Extended Gold Mining Company, with James Judge as manager, dewatered the Grant and Sunset Extended shafts (which connected to the Sunset, General Grant and Duke of Edinburgh shafts), and re-timbered the Grant and Sunset Extended, General Grant, and Sunset underlie (No.1) shafts. Work on the Sunset underlie (No.1) shaft had commenced in 1934. The London North mine was reopened by RJ Hedlefs in 1937, and Basque miners were working the Sunset No. 2 shaft at this time.

The Little Grand Junction mine, located at the intersection of Siggers Street and School Street, on the old Grand Junction Lease No.520, The Little Grand Junction mine is close to the site of the Grand Junction mine's No.1 shaft. was operated from 1937 to 1942 by local miners Henry John Bowrey and John Thomas Blackmore. The 1937 operation closed in 1942. Five men were employed at the mine in 1940. The shaft had apparently been sunk previously by the Grand Junction Consolidated Gold Mining Company; and Bowrey and Party reconditioned it and extended the existing workings.

In 1938, Archibald and Heuir set up a mill on the bank of One Mile Creek to treat mullock dumps, and the Ravenswood Gold Mining Syndicate (formed 1937, with James Judge as manager) began treating the mullock dumps of the Sunset mine in late 1938. The same syndicate also dewatered and reopened part of the Grant and Sunset Extended; and the Grand Junction mine was reopened by Judge c. 1939-1942. It was reported that the Grand Junction Consolidated mine was reopened briefly in 1941 by a Townsville syndicate.

The Ravenswood Gold Mining Syndicate's (Judge's) mill initially consisted of 10 head of stamps obtained from the Mother Lode Mill at Mount Wright (northwest of Ravenswood), powered by a diesel engine. The ore was crushed by the stamper battery, concentrated with Wilfley tables, and then either treated with cyanide or sent to the Chillagoe smelters. Initial success with some rich ore led to enlargement of the mill to 30 stamps in 1939–1940. The annual report for 1940 claimed the mill had been expanded to 30 head of stamps during 1940, but work was reportedly also underway on the expansion in late 1939. A Stirling boiler and a 250 hp engine were also obtained from the Burdekin meatworks (Sellheim), and a rock breaker, elevator and conveyor were installed. However, the upgraded mill proved to be overpowered and required a lot of timber fuel; the brick foundations used for the machinery were not strong enough; and the best ore from the Sunset had already been treated, so the mill closed early in 1942 and the plant was moved to Cloncurry.

Also in 1938, Maxwell Partridge and William Ralston installed a new plant south of Elphinstone Creek, to the immediate west of the Mabel Mill's old cyanide works, to re-treat the old tailings with cyanide. A ball mill, filter and other plant were purchased from the Golden Mile, Cracow in 1939, while later that year a suction gas engine and flotation machine were also installed. This operation closed c. 1942, and the coloured sands on the site today are residues from the flotation process: the yellow sand is from the flotation of iron pyrites; the grey sands are copper tailings; and the black material is zinc tailings.

There was limited activity on the goldfield in the late 1940s to early 1960s. The Empire Gold Mining Syndicate treated mullock dumps from The Irish Girl, London, and Sunset mines from 1946 to 1949, as well as some of the dumps from the Grand Junction (1947). The Duke of Edinburgh mine was briefly reopened by Cuevas and Wilson in 1947, and the Cornish boilers on the site (one with the maker's mark 'John Danks & Son Pty Ltd makers Melbourne) may relate to this (unsuccessful) operation. John Danks and Son Pty Ltd began as a plumbing business in 1859. In 1889 John Danks and Son Limited was formed and in 1951 it became a subsidiary of Danks Holdings Limited. Percy Kean reopened the Great Extended mine at Totley in 1947, and later purchased Partridge's mill in 1951 to use it as a flotation plant to treat the silver-lead ore from Totley, adding a diesel engine, stonebreaker, Wilfley tables and classifier. The Totley mines closed in 1954, although the Great Extended mine was briefly sub-leased by Silver Horizons No Liability, in 1964. Partridge's mill was closed c. 1965.

Other attempts were made in the early 1950s to rework old sites. A Townsville syndicate led by Leslie Cook and George Blackmore reopened the Grand Junction mine in 1951, but it soon closed. James Judge also recommenced gold mining at Donnybrook, but closed in 1954; while 900 tons of tailings from the Deep mine's mill site were taken for re-treatment at Heuir's cyanide plant in the early 1950s.

=== A new industry ===
In the 1960 and 1970s, Ravenswood's population shrank to its nadir of about 70 people. At the same time, there was a growing nostalgic interest in old towns in Australia. In 1968 the landscape of Ravenswood was described in romantic terms: "Mute testimonials are the numerous mullock heaps which dot the countryside; the rusty remains of steam engines; stampers which were used to crush stone; and collapsed cyanide vats... Derelict poppet-heads...stand above deep, abandoned shafts. Colossal columns of chimney stacks rise majestically from the entanglement of rubber vines and Chinese apple trees." Some locals realised that preserving the town's surviving historic buildings and structures was necessary to attract tourists and create a new local industry.

From this time onwards the town's mining heritage was seen as an asset. The National Trust of Queensland met with locals in 1974, and a conservation plan for the town was published in 1975. Later, the town sites of Totley and Ravenswood were both entered into the National Trust of Queensland Register. Comments from an International Council on Monuments and Sites (ICOMOS) trip to northern Australia in 1978 included "[Ravenswood]...is one of the most evocative (gold towns of Australia) and this must be preserved. A policy of "all that is necessary but as little as possible" must be strongly pursued". The increased population of north Queensland, longer paid holidays, improved roads and the rise of car ownership after World War II, all increased visitation to Ravenswood, as did the completion of a road past Ravenswood to the Burdekin Dam, in the 1980s. As a result, the town and its mining landscape have been represented in brochures, art and photography. In particular, the landmark qualities of the tall brick chimneys are a distinctive feature in representations of Ravenswood.

=== Modern operations ===
However, gold mining recommenced at Ravenswood in the 1980s, due to a rise in the gold price and the efficiencies gained from open cut mining and modern cyanide metallurgical extraction processes, in which the ore is finely ground in rotary mills, before being treated in a sodium cyanide solution and the gold is extracted using granulated activated carbon. From 1983–86 the Northern Queensland Gold Company Ltd conducted agglomeration heap-leaching (spraying a sodium cyanide solution on previously mined material heaped on a plastic membrane), in the process removing a landmark tailings dump at King's mine in Totley, and mullock heaps from the Grant and Sunset mines. In 1987 Carpentaria Gold commenced open cut mining of the Buck reef (the Buck Reef West pit) near the old Grant and Sunset mines on the south side of the town. Later, pits were dug further east along the reef. Some underground mining was also undertaken from the Buck Reef West pit until 1993, which broke into the old workings of the General Grant, Sunset, and Duke of Edinburgh mines. The old headframe at the Grant and Sunset Extended was demolished in 1988, and replaced with a new steel headframe, which was used until 1993 and then removed. The Melaneur-Shelmalier-Black Jack-Overlander reef complex, on the north side of the town, was mined as an open cut 1990–91, before being backfilled as a golf course. The Nolan's Gully open cut commenced in 1993.

Although modern mining revived the economy of the town, it did not replicate the building boom of the early 20th century.

The heritage significance of Ravenswood's surviving mining infrastructure was recognised in a 1996 Queensland Mining Heritage Places Study by Jane Lennon & Associates and Howard Pearce; and a 2000 Conservation Management Plan by Peter Bell. In 2006, the population of Ravenswood, the oldest surviving inland town in north Queensland, was 191.

== Description ==
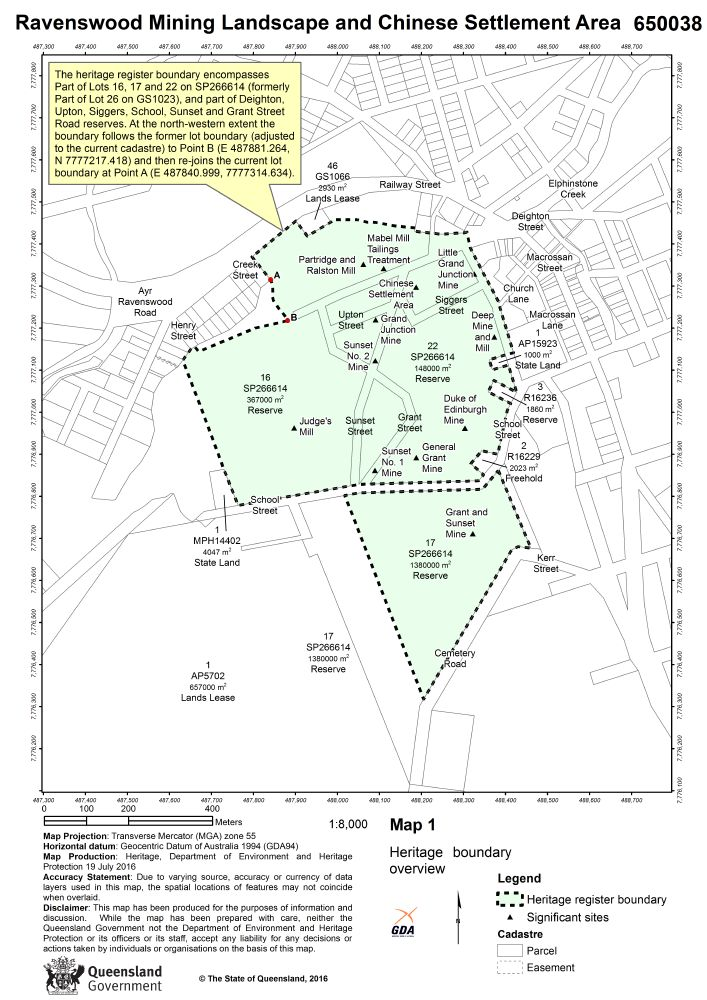
Site map, 2016

The Ravenswood Mining Landscape and Chinese Settlement Area occupies an area of approximately 50ha in the north Queensland town of Ravenswood. Bounded by Elphinstone Creek to the north and west, and School Street and Kerr Street to the east, the landscape consists of an expanse of undulating modified ground punctuated by mullock heaps, tall brick chimneys and other scattered ruins. There are 12 former mine and mill sites dispersed across the area, and Chinese sites including a temple and associated pig roasting oven are concentrated in the vicinity of Deighton Street to the north (shown on the site map).

The Ravenswood Mining Landscape and Chinese Settlement Area is surrounded to the north, west and east by Ravenswood township. Significant buildings adjoining the landscape include Ravenswood School and Residence, Ravenswood Ambulance Station, and the Railway Hotel. An active mining area around the Buck Reef West open cut (1987) occupies the southern extents of the historical mining landscape.

While individual ruins have been subject to deterioration, they continue to illustrate characteristics of their former function. Collectively they are a physical legacy of the complex and innovative history of mining in the area. Elements that have been relocated or adapted for modern use are of lesser significance than in-situ elements; however, they provide evidence of historical change and contribute to the significance of the overall mining and settlement landscape. Modern mining infrastructure, modern mullock heaps, fencing and the Buck Reef West open cut mining operations are not of heritage significance.

=== Ravenswood Mining Landscape ===
The Ravenswood Mining Landscape has been formed through various phases of alluvial and reef mining activities from the late 1860s to the 1960s; however, the majority of surface evidence of mining infrastructure dates from the New Ravenswood Company era (1899–1917); and subsequent intermittent small scale mining and re-treatment of old mullock heaps and tailings dumps (1919–1960s). Judge's Mill and the Partridge and Ralston Mill date from the 1930s.

The former General Grant, Duke of Edinburgh and Sunset No 1 Mines are situated on the northern edge of the modern Buck Reef West open cut and, along with the former Grant and Sunset Extended mine to the south, are wholly or partly within the active (restricted) mining area. To the north, the former Sunset No 2, Grand Junction and Little Grand Junction Mines, along with the Deep Mine and Mill, Judge's Mill, Partridges Mill and adjacent Mabel Mill Tailings Treatment Site are publicly accessible.

=== Former Grant and Sunset Extended Mine (c. 1902–1930s) ===
The most southern of the mining landscape sites, the former Grant and Sunset Extended Mine (see the site map) retains evidence from the New Ravenswood Company era and small scale mining from the 1930s including:

- Square brick chimney – a tall, red brick chimney; square in plan with arched openings on all four sides of the base. It has two render-capped, corbelled brick cornices with sawtooth course; one at the top of the base, the other near the top of the narrowed stack.
- Winding engine site – an assemblage of brick and concrete mounts with embedded metal fixtures, situated to the southwest of the shaft. The main brick winding mounts comprise four bays of red brick, with openings facing northeast. Additional mounts to the southeast are a combination of red brick and concrete render. A cylindrical metal boiler with riveted joins is situated to the south of the mounts.

The mine shaft is located to the northwest of the winding engine site. It was reconfigured (c. 1988) for modern use and has a concrete collar, metal grid and cage surround, as well as modern concrete headframe footings and machinery foundations nearby.

The area has been subject to earthworks and vegetation clearance. Two disturbed concrete headframe footings have been moved to the southwest of the winding engine site. Both are square in plan and have a 0.5 metres (1 ft 8 in) diameter hole through the centre, with metal bracing within. One footing retains remnant timbers.

A ramped earth structure is situated to the north of the mine site; it is supported at its western end by boulders, corrugated and plate metal sheeting, and substantial round timbers (possibly reused headframe timbers).

=== Former General Grant Mine (c. 1869–1930s) ===
Located north of the Grant and Sunset Extended mine, the General Grant Mine (see the site map) is prominently positioned on a ridge overlooking the mining landscape. It retains evidence from the New Ravenswood Company era and small scale mining from the 1920s-30s including:

- Shaft site – a semi-circular cutting visible on the edge of the modern Buck Reef West open cut pit indicates the location of a former shaft.
- Square brick chimney – a tall, red brick chimney; square in plan with one arched opening on the western side of the base. It has two render-capped, corbelled brick cornices; one at the top of the base and another near the top of the narrowed stack, which has a sawtooth course.
- Winding engine site – an assemblage of concrete and brick mounts, a vertical boiler and a concrete cooling tank; situated to the southwest of the chimney and northwest of the shaft. The northern engine mounts are constructed of concrete and brick. The concrete winding mounts to the south are connected to the rectangular concrete cooling pond. The vertical boiler to the east is constructed of riveted plate-metal.

The area has been subject to earthworks and vegetation clearance. Disturbed mullock, and concrete mounts and footings are visible across an elevated area to the east of the winding engine site that has been bulldozed. Part of a second square brick chimney stack (twenty courses high) lies amongst the upturned concrete mounts.

Two disturbed concrete headframe footings are located in the low-lying area between the General Grant and Duke of Edinburgh Mines.

=== Former Duke of Edinburgh Mine (c. 1869–1940s) ===
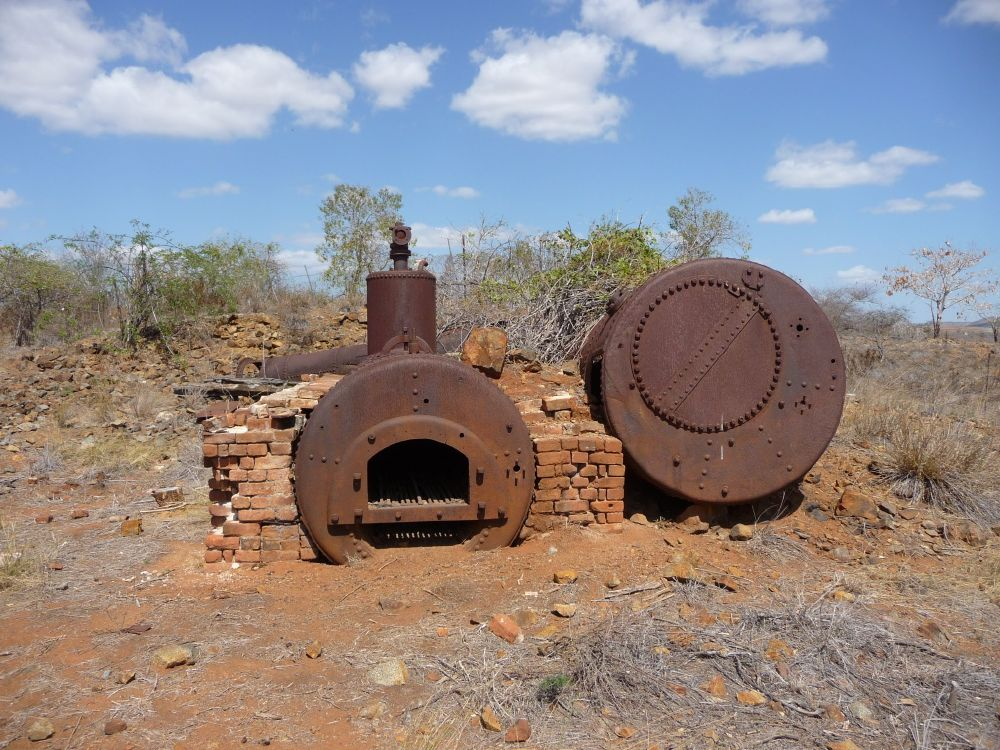
Cornish boilers at former Duke of Edinburgh Mine, from west, 2015

Located on a ridge to the east of the General Grant Mine, the Duke of Edinburgh Mine (refer to the site map) retains evidence from the New Ravenswood Company era and small scale mining from the 1920s to 1940s including:

- Underlie headframe site – located on an area of mounded mullock between a boiler house site (west) and caved workings (east). An alignment of circular depressions on the top of the mullock indicate where the underlie headframe once stood. A piece of timber from the collapsed headframe lies northeast of the boilers.
- Boiler house site – an assemblage of two parallel Cornish boilers (one adapted for use as a water tank) and a section of iron chimney, located on the slope to the west of the headframe site. The northern boiler is marked "John Danks & Son Pty Ltd makers Melbourne"; it has an arched doorway to the west, an internal metal rack and is set into an earth-filled brick mount with a flue at the eastern end. The southern boiler / water tank has closed ends and sits directly on the ground. The cylindrical iron chimney lies at the head (east end) of the boiler; it is constructed of riveted metal plates.

A modern fence that defines the boundary of the active mining operations traverses the mine site. Access to the caved underlie shaft and workings to the east of the headframe site is restricted.

=== Former Sunset No 1 Mine (c. 1869–1940s) ===
Located on a ridge to the west of the General Grant Mine, Sunset No1 Mine (see the site map) overlooks the Sunset No2 Mine to the north. It retains evidence from the New Ravenswood Company era and small scale mining from the 1920s to 1940s including:

- Shaft site – a caved shaft, surrounded by a modern fence, located on the eastern side of the site.
- Brick magazine/furnace – a small square-plan brick structure with an opening facing east, situated to the southwest of the caved shaft. There is weathered paint on the external brickwork. The roof is vaulted and rendered externally; the interior has corbelled brickwork surrounding a square opening and has a blackened interior (evidence of burning). An iron flue pipe lies to the northwest and the bases of two small square brick structures are located to the immediate northeast.
- Winding plant foundations – two rectangular brick foundations (up to eight courses high) situated on the western side of the site.

An earth mound at the centre of the site indicates the location of the former underlie shaft headframe, and an area of disturbed mullock extends down the northern slope of the site. A large flattened clearing extends from the northeast to the northwest of the site; indicating the location of the former Sunset No 1 mullock heap (treated and removed c. 1983).

=== Former Sunset No 2 Mine (c. 1869–1940s) ===
Located at the centre of the mining landscape, to the north of Sunset No1 Mine and south of Grand Junction Mine, Sunset No 2 Mine (see the site map) is situated at the intersection of Sunset Street and Grant Street (both unsealed). It retains evidence from the New Ravenswood Company era, and small scale mining and re-treatment of old mullock heaps from the 1920s to 1940s including:

- Shaft and headframe site – a caved shaft surrounded by four square concrete headframe footings with rendered capping, and a modern fence. Two other disturbed concrete footings are located to the north, between the headframe site and the tailings treatment site.
- Octagonal brick chimney – a tall, red brick chimney with a square base and octagonal stack, located to the west of the shaft. It has two render-capped, corbelled brick cornices; one at the top of the base, which has a sawtooth course, and another near the top of the narrowed stack. The base has evidence of tuck pointing. The foundations of a small square brick structure are positioned immediately south of the chimney.
- Winding engine site – an assemblage of concrete mounts with embedded metal fixtures, situated to the northwest of the chimney and west of the headframe site. The air compressor mounts to the north comprise parallel concrete mounts; the adjacent concrete winding engine mounts are U-shaped in plan.
- Tailings treatment site – an earth basin extends southeast of a modified gully to the north of the mine; it contains corrugated metal sheeting and a small iron Pelton wheel embedded in remnant tailings. A concrete launder and two metal pipes align east-west in the gully, and intersect with a stone culvert on Sunset Street.

An area of mullock extends to the north of the tailings treatment site; it includes a large heap situated between Sunset No 2 Mine and Grand Junction Mine to the north.

=== Former Grand Junction Mine (c. 1901–1950s) ===
Located off Sunset Street, to the north of Sunset No 2 Mine and south of Partridges Mill, the Grand Junction Mine (see the site map) retains evidence from the New Ravenswood Company era and small scale mining from the 1930s to 1950s including:

- Shaft and headframe site – a filled shaft surrounded by three square concrete headframe footings with rendered capping. The shaft is situated at the southeast corner of an open cut pit, and the area is surrounded by a modern fence.
- Square brick chimney – a tall, red brick chimney; square in plan with arched openings on the north, east and south sides of the base (the eastern arch being higher than the others). It has two render-capped, corbelled brick cornices; one at the top of the base, which has a sawtooth course, the other near the top of the narrowed stack.
- Winding engine site – a concrete engine mount with embedded metal fixtures, situated to the southeast of the shaft.
- Mullock heap – a large mullock heap located immediately south of the shaft site.

Two small earth mounds are situated to the northeast of the chimney. An unsealed track traverses the site, between the fenced shaft and the winding engine mounts.

=== Former Little Grand Junction Mine (c. 1901–1940s) ===
Located near the intersection of Siggers Street and School Street road reserves, the Little Grand Junction Mine is situated on a rise to the southwest of the former Ravenswood Ambulance Station. Little Grand Junction (see the site map) is the most southern of three mine shafts in the immediate vicinity, with a fourth shaft down the hill on Deighton Street. It retains evidence from the New Ravenswood Company era and small scale mining from the 1930s and 1940s including:

- Shaft site – a caved shaft surrounded by a modern fence, located on the northern side of the site.
- Winding engine site – an assemblage of concrete engine mounts with embedded metal fixtures, situated to the south of the shaft.

Small, disturbed mounds of mullock are situated to the north and west of the shaft.

=== Former Deep Mine and Mill (c. 1902–1919) ===
Located on the eastern fringe of the mining landscape, the Deep Mine and Mill (see the site map) is situated on a west-facing slope off School Street. It retains evidence from the New Ravenswood Company era, and sporadic processing following renovation of the mill in 1919, including:

==== Mine site (south) ====
- Shaft and headframe site – a caved shaft retaining one square concrete headframe footing, surrounded by a modern metal fence.
- Round brick chimney – a tall, red brick chimney with a square base and round stack, located to the west of the shaft. It has two render-capped, corbelled brick cornices with sawtooth courses; one at the top of the base and another near the top of the narrowed stack. The square base has arched openings on all sides. An area of light grey soil in the location of the former flue extends west to a brick platform.
- Winding plant, boiler and engine house site – an assemblage of concrete and brick mounts with embedded metal fixtures, situated to the south of the chimney. The winding engine mounts are brick and the air-compressor mounts to the south are brick with concrete tops. A rectilinear, riveted metal tank is situated to the southwest of the mounts.
- Mullock heap – a large mullock heap located immediately southwest of the mine site.
- Explosives magazine – a rendered brick magazine situated south of the mullock heap. It has two perpendicular, vaulted compartments with doorways facing north and west.

==== Mill / battery site (north) ====
- Stamp battery site – concrete battery mounts (for five head of stamps) with embedded metal fixtures; and boiler and engine house site comprising brick mounts with embedded metal fixtures and a substantial piece of remnant timber attached.
- Strongroom – a rendered, one-room brick structure with a vaulted roof and decorative north-facing elevation that has a circular motif to the parapet; located west of the boiler and engine house site
- Wilfley table site – a series of rendered brick platforms, square ponds and round tanks extending west and south from the battery mounts. Concrete channels connect some of the tanks and post holes indicate where the superstructure once stood.
- Concentrate settling tanks – a collection of rectilinear brick tanks, downhill and to the west of the battery. The tanks contain bright yellow / orange sediments (from the cyaniding process) and residues leaching from the brickwork. Two of the larger tanks have west-facing openings with metal surrounds, and one retains parallel timber logs embedded in the sediment. The smaller tanks to the north have metal bracing and fixtures.
- Tailings dump – an area of bright yellow / orange sediments extending to the northwest of the concentrate settling tanks.
- A gully to the northwest of the mill contains substantial pieces of remnant timber, and a second caved shaft is located to the west of the main mine site.

==== Mabel Mill Tailings Treatment Plant (c. 1904–1917) ====
Located on the northern fringe of the mining landscape, between Deighton Street and Elphinstone Creek, the Mabel Mill Tailings Treatment Plant (see the site map) is an extension of the Mabel Mill to the north of the creek. The site retains evidence of mineral processing from the New Ravenswood Company era including:

- Mill site – concrete mounts on a concrete slab platform. A row of three pairs of high mounts aligns on the south side of the slab and lower ball mill mounts to the north. A concrete tank is located near the centre of the slab and alignments of post holes indicate where the superstructure previously stood.
- Cyanide works – an assemblage of high, rendered brick mounts arranged in two parallel north-south alignments, situated to the northwest of the ball mill site. A boiler site at the northern end has brick mounts and a concrete pond. Brick paving, some in a herringbone pattern and some rendered, extends across part of the area.
- Tailings dump – a large flat area of pale yellow, grey and orange sediments to the northeast of the mill and cyanide works. Eroded gullies traverse the tailings area, exposing the layering of sediments and in-situ glass and ceramic artefacts that have been deposited on the site.
- Assay office – concrete slab with brick furnace and chimney foundations at the western end; located to the southwest of the mill site.

=== Former Partridge and Ralston Mill (c. 1938–1965) ===
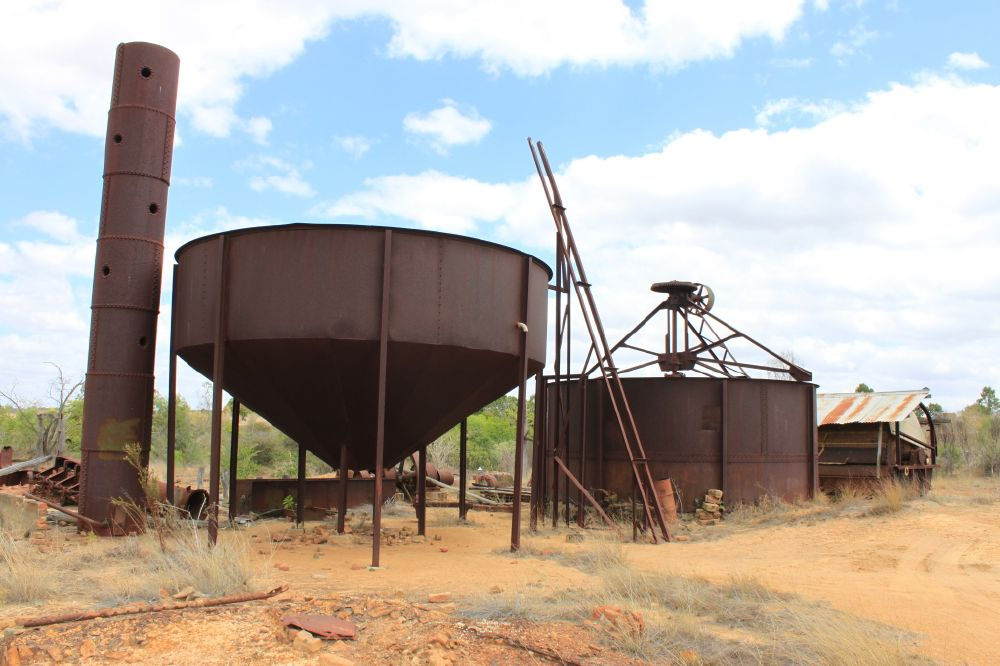
Former Partridge and Ralston Mill cyanide tanks, from south-east, 2015

Located to the immediate west of the Mabel Mill Tailings Treatment area, the Partridge and Ralston Mill (see the site map) is situated between Deighton Street and Elphinstone Creek. The site retains evidence of intermittent mineral processing from the late 1930s to 1960s including:

- Cyanide tanks – two substantial round metal tanks; the on-ground cyanide agitator to the north retains its internal mechanism and the cyanide cone to the south is suspended on metal posts.
- Wilfley table site – interconnected concrete and rendered brick mounts with embedded metal fixtures, situated to the northwest of the cyanide tanks. Three vertical iron pipes protrude from ground; one encased with brickwork. Timber posts indicate the outline of the former shed. A rendered brick platform extends to the west.
- Mill shed site – timber posts indicate the outline of the shed that stood to the west of the cyanide tanks. The area contains some concrete mounts and remnant plant including: a ‘Crossley Manchester’ diesel engine (two-cylinder diesel engine with flywheel and concrete mounts); a relocated Kraut flotation unit; and a rectangular cyanide tank divided into five bays.
- Additional plant – an Oliver filter unit (north of the cyanide tanks); a small ball mill used as an amalgamation unit (north of the cyanide tanks); an Akins classifier (relocated northwest of the Wilfley table site); and a grinding pan marked ‘Langlands Foundry Co, Melbourne Limited’ (relocated east of the cyanide tanks).
- Brick settling tanks – a collection of square rendered brick tanks (two intact) and foundations, situated south of the mill shed site. Dark grey residues indicate the presence of zinc tailings. The area is dissected by a modern gravel path.
- Limonite tailings – a long narrow deposit of bright yellow / orange tailings that extends from south of the mill towards the creek to the west. A row of parallel round timber posts protrude from the tailings alignment.

=== Former Judge's Mill (c. 1938–1940s) ===
Located in the western extents of the mining landscape, the Judge's Mill site (see the site map) retains evidence of the Ravenswood Gold Mining Syndicate's mineral processing activities from the late 1930s - early 1940s including:

- Stamp batteries – concrete and brick stamp battery mounts for three ten-head stamper units. Three of the six mortar boxes remain in-situ; one is fully intact with five head of stamps, one is branded “Union Ironworks San Francisco 1903” and another is broken. An ore dump and the remains of metal ore bins are scattered to the east of the battery.
- Concentrating mill – an assemblage of concrete mounts and rendered brick and stone mill foundations to the west of the battery. There is a ramp in the west corner and concrete Wilfley table mounts are located in the south corner. A metal belt shaft lies amongst the concrete mounts, and a large iron cone has been relocated to the north of the mill foundations.
- Brick strongroom – a single room brick structure with flat concrete slab roof, located to the south of the battery. It is square in plan with a doorway facing west.
- Engine House – a collection of off-form concrete diesel engine mounts and pits located to the south of the concentrating mill. An elevated belt shaft to the southeast is mounted on two tall concrete mounts.
- Boiler house – a concrete chimney base and disturbed brick structure, connected by a dog-legged flue with a stone-lined cutting and a rendered brick vaulted top. A large Stirling water tube boiler has been relocated to the south of the boiler house, and a Cornish boiler casing lies to the west.
- Cooling pond – a large rectangular concrete tank with an alignment of four concrete piers in the centre and a recess with outlets at the west end.

An earth ramp and crushed ore deposit is situated to the south of the strongroom. The site is traversed by an unsealed road and a crushed granite walking track.

=== Chinese Settlement Area ===
The Chinese Settlement Area dates from the 1870s to the early 20th century. While the settlement area included market gardens along Elphinstone Creek, the remaining physical evidence is concentrated south of Deighton Street and comprises the ruins of a temple, adjacent pig roasting oven, and associated archaeological features and artefact scatters (see Archaeological Evidence).

==== Former Temple (c. 1874) ====
The temple remnants are located south of Deighton Street and comprise a series of concrete, stone and earth platforms with overall dimensions of approximately 22 metres (72 ft) long and 10–11 metres (33–36 ft) wide (Deighton Street is shown on the site map). The temple is orientated roughly north-south. From north to south the five platforms comprise:

- Earth platform (approximately 6 by 11 metres (20 ft × 36 ft)) with some surface fragments of thin concrete slab.
- Stone alignment defining small step up to thin concrete slab on earth platform (approximately 2 by 11 metres (6 ft 7 in × 36 ft 1 in)) with stone edge to the east.
- Small step up to thin concrete slab on earth platform (approximately 4 by 11 metres (13 ft × 36 ft)) with stone edge to the east. An east-west alignment of post holes is set back approximately 0.8 metres (2 ft 7 in) from northern slab edge.
- Small step up to concrete slab (approximately 4 by 10 metres (13 ft × 33 ft)) with rendered stone edge to the east. An east-west alignment of four square post holes (170 by 170 millimetres (6.7 in × 6.7 in)) with metal sleeves is set back approximately 3 metres (9.8 ft) from northern slab edge.
- Two steps up to concrete slab (approximately 5.2 by 10 metres (17 ft × 33 ft)) with rendered stone edge to the east and south.

A disturbed earth mound is situated to the south of the temple foundations. It has stone and brick inclusions and random-rubble stonework to the eastern end.

==== Former Pig Roasting Oven ====
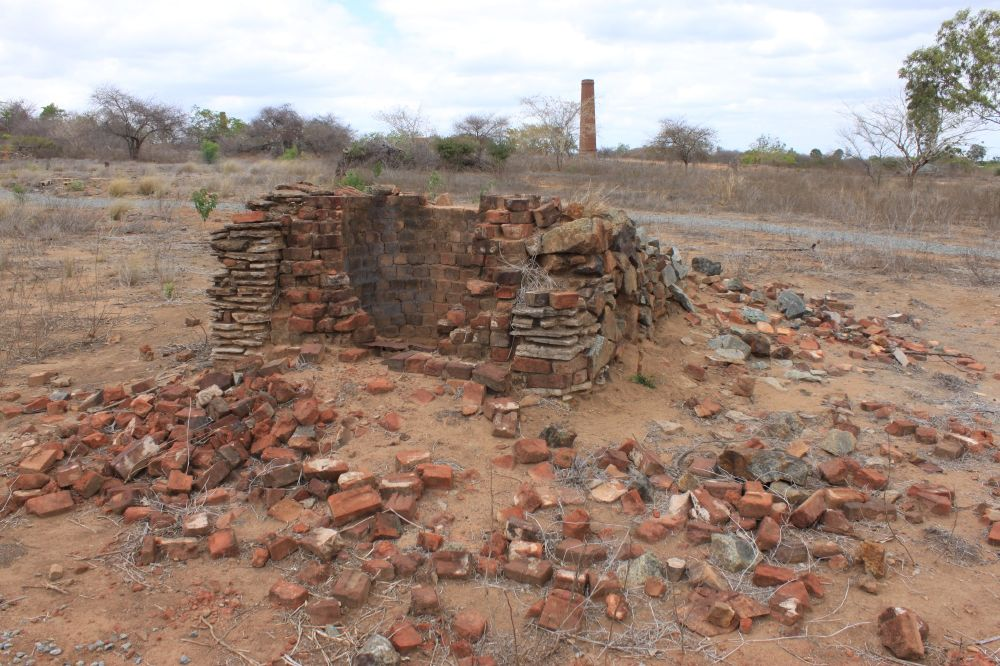
Chinese pig roasting oven with Grand Junction chimney in background, from the north-east, 2015

Eighteen metres to the northeast of the temple foundations are the remains of a brick and stone pig roasting oven. The structure (approximately 5 by 2 metres (16.4 ft × 6.6 ft)) is aligned east-west. The upper section has collapsed and it currently stands at 1.1 metres (3 ft 7 in) high. The eastern end of the structure features a cylindrical brick and mortar hearth with stacked render framing the opening. The remaining structure is less formal in construction, comprising random-rubble stone and earth that has collapsed to the west.

=== Setting and Landscape Features ===
Elphinstone Creek winds across the north and west of the mining landscape, which is traversed by a network of unsealed roads and walking tracks. The area has been cleared of remnant vegetation and regrowth is dominated by chinee apple (Ziziphus mauritiana) and rubber vine (Cryptostegia grandiflora). Stands of various eucalypt species have been planted in an area that extends to the north of Duke of Edinburgh and east of Sunset No 2 Mines.

Much of the ground surface has been modified by the historical and subsequent mining operations. Mullock heaps punctuate the undulating landscape, most notably in the vicinity of the Grand Junction, Sunset No 2 and Deep Mines. A total of five prominent brick chimneys are dotted across the landscape. They have a range of stack types: three square; one round and one octagonal, and are a distinctive feature of the place.

Views are afforded to, from and across the mining landscape from a range of vantage points. Several of the mine sites (General Grant, Sunset No1, Duke of Edinburgh and Deep Mine) are elevated and offer panoramic views across the mining landscape and the town. Views from lower vantage points and along the tracks also offer glimpses of nearby and elevated features in the surrounding landscape, in particular the prominent brick chimneys.

=== Archaeological Evidence ===
Artefacts associated with mining infrastructure and operations are concentrated amongst the ruins of the mine and mill sites, including: bottle glass; ceramics; bricks; and metal containers, cables, fixtures and fittings.

Moderate density scatters of industrial and domestic glass and ceramic artefacts extend across the ground surface to the east of the Mabel Mill tailings treatment plant, along Elphinstone Creek. A sub-surface concentration of black and green glass bottles is evident in an eroded gully within the Mabel Mill tailings treatment area.

High density artefact scatters associated with the Chinese temple and oven site include glass, ceramics and metal. There is some evidence of cooked bone fragments to the immediate west of the eroded oven.

An area to the south and west of the temple site contains several higher density concentrations of domestic artefacts accompanied by flattened sheets of kerosene tins, buckets, kettles, and drystone wall and platform features, which indicate the location of habitation sites. Ceramics of Chinese origin are evident at some of these sites. A narrow (0.85-metre (2 ft 9 in)) brick lined shaft, possibly a well, is located on the south side of Deighton Street, near the former intersection with School Street.

An area containing evidence of possible alluvial mining is located immediately south of Judge's Mill and to the west of Sunset No 1 Mine. It comprises a gully with a regular channel cutting to the base (possible water race) and small earth mounds deposited along the banks. Artefact scatters extend along the banks of the gully and include ceramics, bottle glass and wire cut nails.

== Heritage listing ==
Ravenswood Mining Landscape and Chinese Settlement Area was listed on the Queensland Heritage Register on 14 October 2016 having satisfied the following criteria.

The place is important in demonstrating the evolution or pattern of Queensland's history.

The Ravenswood Mining Landscape and Chinese Settlement Area is important in demonstrating the historical development of gold mining in Queensland. The Ravenswood goldfield (discovered 1868) was the first significant goldfield in north Queensland, the fifth largest gold producer in Queensland during the late 19th and early 20th centuries, and an Australian leader in metallurgy.

The mining landscape, including the ruins of 12 mines and mills punctuated by mullock heaps, is a physical legacy of the complex and innovative history of mining in the area. It contains important surviving evidence of mining operations conducted on and near the Ravenswood goldfield's most productive reefs during the boom period of the town's prosperity (1900–08). It also retains important surviving evidence of the evolution of mining practices, in particular the range of innovative technologies developed to extract gold from sulphide, or mundic, ores.

The Chinese settlement area, which dates from the 1870s to the early 20th century, is important in demonstrating Chinese involvement in the exploitation of natural resources and the evolution of mining settlements in Queensland. It retains important physical evidence of Ravenswood's early Chinese community, including the remains of the earliest known Chinese temple in Queensland and an adjacent pig roasting oven.

The place demonstrates rare, uncommon or endangered aspects of Queensland's cultural heritage.

The remnants of the temple (the earliest known in Queensland) and pig roasting oven are rare surviving evidence of Ravenswood's Chinese community, which constituted an important but little-known part of Ravenswood's history. The temple and pig roasting oven site is a rare surviving example of the combination of these two elements in a Chinese settlement in Queensland.

The place has potential to yield information that will contribute to an understanding of Queensland's history.

The extensive mining landscape - its surface ruins, artefact scatters, and potential alluvial and sub-surface workings - has the potential to reveal information about late 19th and early 20th century mining practices and treatment processes.

The medium and high density artefact scatters, some domestic in origin and associated with evidence of habitation, have the potential to contribute to our understanding of the occupants and their material culture, and the proximity of industrial and domestic life in a remote goldfield settlement.

The rare Chinese temple and oven site, and associated artefact scatters, has the potential to yield information regarding early temple and oven construction methodology, the relationship between the two elements and their function in the community.

The place is important in demonstrating the principal characteristics of a particular class of cultural places.

Characterised by its broad sweeps of modified ground, and collection of ruins from diverse mining and processing practices, the Ravenswood mining landscape is an excellent example of a historical goldfield. It retains the ruins of eight mines and four mills that are collectively important in illustrating the principal characteristics of reef gold ore extraction and metallurgical extraction sites from the late 19th and early 20th century.

The mine sites retain evidence of caved shafts, winding plant and engine mounts, and brick chimneys - key elements in layouts that demonstrate the ore extraction process. The mill sites retain evidence of their stamp battery and ball mill mounts, strong rooms, Wilfley table mounts, cyanide plants, settling tanks and tailings - complex assemblages that demonstrate ore crushing, concentrating, and other metallurgical processes required to extract gold from the mundic ore for which the Ravenswood goldfield was renowned.

The Ravenswood Chinese settlement area is important in demonstrating the characteristics of Chinese community settlements at north Queensland goldfields. Located close to Elphinstone Creek, along which the Chinese community were active in the cultivation of fresh produce, it is a specific cultural settlement area situated on the periphery of the main retail precinct of Ravenswood. It retains the ruins of a temple and adjacent pig roasting oven - physical elements in a spatial arrangement that demonstrate the social and cultural practices of goldfield Chinese communities.

The place is important because of its aesthetic significance.

The Ravenswood Mining Landscape and Chinese Settlement Area, a distinctive, modified landscape punctuated by brick chimneys, mullock heaps and other remnant mining structures, is an reminder of the short-lived nature of Queensland's mining booms.

The place expresses the complex history of mining in the area and has picturesque qualities that can be experienced from a range of vantage points. The strong visual impact of the landscape is further enhanced by its close proximity to the town and its surviving historic building stock.

Views of the place and in relation to the town have been represented in brochures, postcards, art and photography. In particular, the landmark qualities of the tall brick chimneys are a distinctive feature in representations of Ravenswood.

The place has a special association with the life or work of a particular person, group or organisation of importance in Queensland's history.

The Ravenswood Mining Landscape and Chinese Settlement Area has a special association with the work of Archibald Lawrence Wilson, Ravenswood's most notable entrepreneur, whose New Ravenswood Company is associated with the development of the gold mining industry in north Queensland, and gave significant impetus to the economic and social development of the region.

Wilson's involvement in raising capital in London had a significant impact on the physical appearance of the landscape through the establishment of numerous new mines and the modification of earlier mines in the early 1900s, evidence of which remains visible across the landscape.
