= Railway Hotel, Ravenswood =

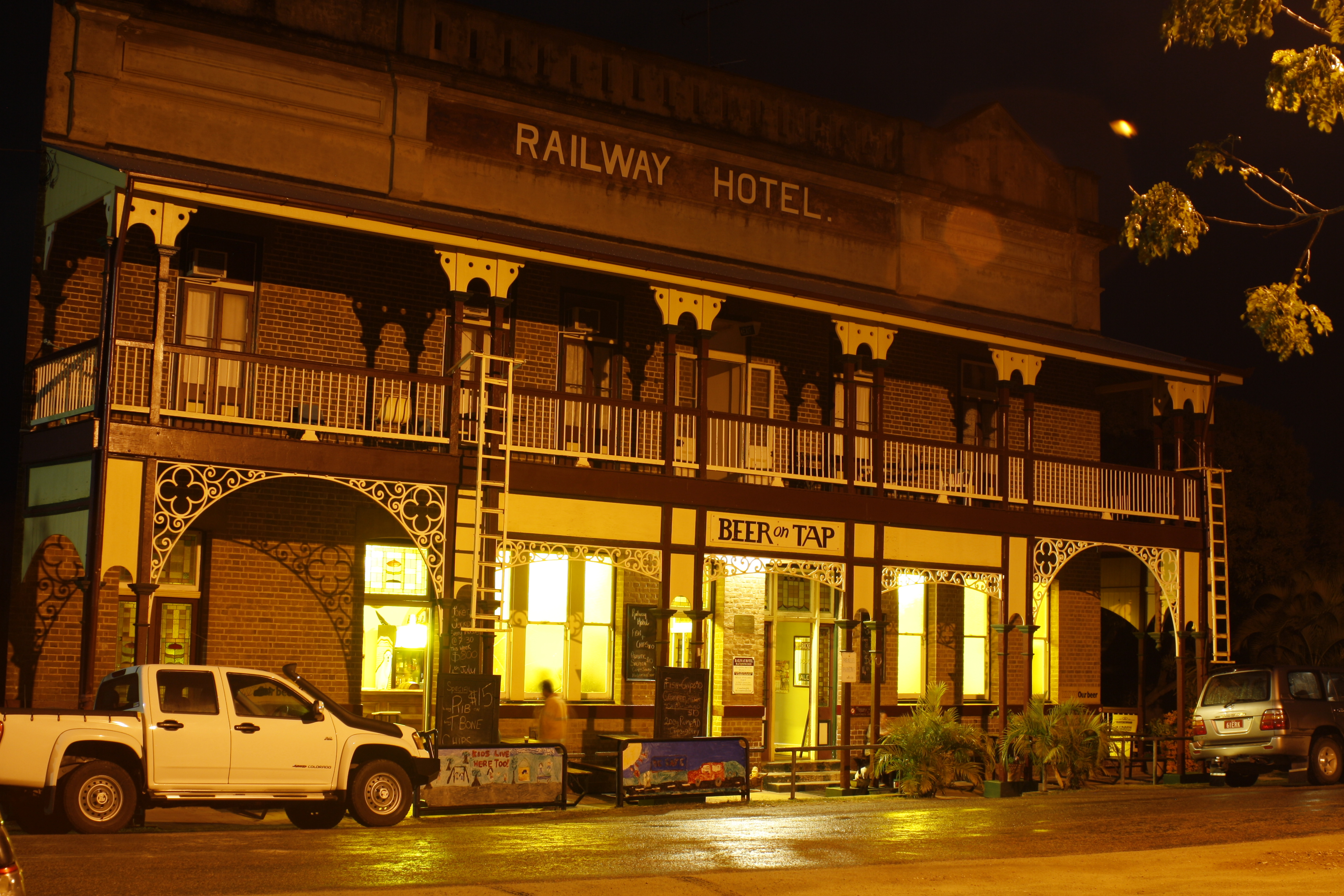
- Railway Hotel at night, 2011

- Location within Queensland Location within Australia
- 20.0996°S 146.8874°E
- Location: Barton Street, Ravenswood, Charters Towers Region, Queensland, Australia

History
- Design period: 1900–1914 (early 20th century)
- Built: c. 1901

Queensland Heritage Register
- Official name: Railway Hotel, Ravenswood
- Type: state heritage (built)
- Designated: 21 October 1992
- Reference no.: 600443
- Significant period: 1900s (fabric) c. 1901–ongoing (historical use)
- Significant components: cellar, furniture/fittings

Railway Hotel is a heritage-listed hotel at Barton Street, Ravenswood, Charters Towers Region, Queensland, Australia. It was built c. 1901. It was added to the Queensland Heritage Register on 21 October 1992.

== History ==
The Railway Hotel, a large brick hotel placed opposite the site of the railway station in Ravenswood, is one of a handful of buildings which survive from this once important mining town. It was built about 1901 for John Moran and is the second hotel of this name he operated on this site.

The discovery of several important goldfields in Queensland in the nineteenth century formed a major component in the development of North Queensland.The need to access and exploit gold finds determined the path of railways, the establishment of related industries and commerce and the location of settlements. Some of these were short lived "rushes", where tent and shanty townships disappeared almost as quickly as they rose. Other settlements based on goldfields became established towns with government and civic buildings, shops and family homes and survived as such. A few became important centres, only to fade away as gold yields fell. Ravenswood was one of these.

The area was first settled by Europeans following the establishment of Bowen in 1861. Pastoral runs were soon set up in the hinterland, including the area on which the Ravenswood field was to develop. The first gold in North Queensland had been found at Star River in 1865 and there were other brief rushes before a substantial find was made at the Cape Diggings in 1867. This triggered further exploration and gold was found at Merri Merriwa, the run on which the town of Ravenswood stands, in 1867, although it was reported as being on the adjoining property of Ravenswood, the name by which the field was always known.

Much of the gold initially found was in a triangle in and around three dry creeks which soon formed the focus for a tent and shanty settlement. Ravenswood gold was in reefs and a small battery was first set up in 1869, followed by the Lady Marian Mill in 1870. The settlement was also surveyed at this time, but by then the goldfield itself, and the buildings and streets already established had shaped the town and the survey merely formalised what was already in place. This can still be seen clearly in the irregularity of the major streets. Ravenswood was gazetted as a town in 1871. At this time it had 30 hotels and a population of about 1000.

It was also beginning to have problems as gold a deeper levels proved to be finely distributed in ore containing other minerals and was difficult to separate either by mechanical or chemical means. This meant that greater capital was required to fund various technologies for extracting the gold. Many miners left for other fields, such as Charters Towers, discovered in 1871 and which quickly overtook Ravenswood as a gold producer and as the most important inland North Queensland town. Despite this, Ravenswood continued to prosper due to a steady, though reduced, production of gold, the discovery of silver at nearby Totley in 1878 and as a commercial centre. By 1874, the town had a courthouse and police station, a post and telegraph office, and a school. Shanties were replaced by sawn timber buildings and as single miners left, more families moved in. The stability of the town was assisted in the 1880s by the arrival of the Great Northern railway which passed close to the town in 1881 on its way from Townsville to Charters Towers, thus reducing the cost of freight, and which was linked to Ravenswood by the Ravenswood branch railway in 1884. In this year Hugh Barton acquired several key mines as the Ravenswood Gold Company and experimented with better means to process Ravenswood ore. His modest success helped to provide employment and stability in the town. A new generation of public buildings replaced those of the early days of the field. It was during this period, in 1886, that the original Railway Hotel was built on this site for A.E. Hawkins, though the hotel was to have several publicans before the license was transferred to John Moran in 1893. Moran was a part owner in the London Mine across the street from the hotel and situated conveniently close to the railway.

In 1899, a new era began for the field when the New Ravenswood Company was formed by Archibald Laurence Wilson who raised overseas capital and took over the Barton mines. Old mines were opened and tailings reworked with more efficiency. The shareholders recouped their investment in the first two years and this drew world-wide interest. It was the beginning of Ravenswood's most prosperous period. In early 1901, a lavish new hotel, the Imperial, was opened only to be burned down and replaced with one even more stylish. Moran may have built the Railway Hotel at about this time.

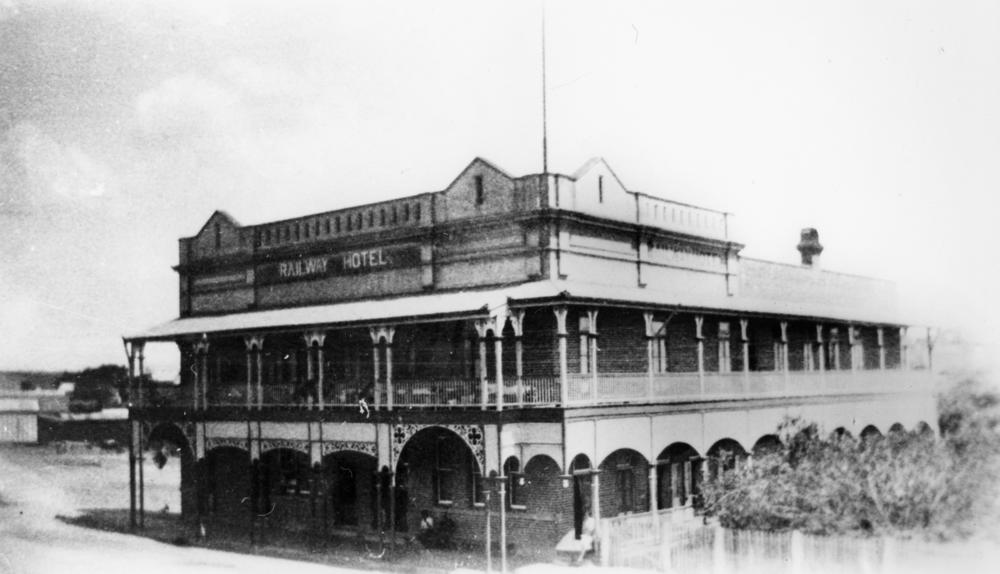
Railway Hotel

The original timber hotel was moved to the opposite side of the road to make way for the construction of the new hotel and burned down shortly afterwards. 1901 was a year of fires and whole blocks on both sides of Macrossan Street were destroyed. A number of buildings, including the Imperial Hotel, were replaced in brick. Bricks had been made locally in Ravenswood since the early days and production capacity increased to meet the demand of the early 1900s. However, it is said that the bricks for the Railway Hotel were constructed at Moran's property at Connolly Creek by an Italian brickmaker. It is possible that this was the first major brick building in Ravenswood as his advertisements for the hotel stress the number of bricks used in the construction, which suggests a certain novelty value. The new hotel offered budget accommodation in a basement level and better quality rooms on the top floor. Moran is thought to have installed a water supply system from the London Mine, situated opposite the hotel, with the water being pumped by a hand pump on the balcony, for which the drain can still be seen. The Moran family ran the hotel until the 1950s, when it was taken over by the current family of publicans.

The population of Ravenswood peaked in 1903 at 4700, but after 1908 the town began to decline. As time went by the cost of extraction grew as returns lessened and Wilson lost money searching for "mother" lodes at deep levels and began to lay miners off. A strike in 1912 dragged out for eight months causing hardship and although judgement eventually favoured the miners, Wilson could no longer afford to employ many of them. The decline of the Ravenswood mines continued with the outbreak of World War I in 1914 increasing costs and disruptions to the labour supply. Buildings began to be sold for removal and in 1916 rail services were cut. In 1917 the New Ravenswood Company closed.

In the 1920s most of the timber buildings in Ravenswood were moved away. The Railway Hotel, being a brick building, could not be moved and continued to trade. Ravenswood Shire ceased to exist in 1929 and was absorbed into Dalrymple Shire. In 1930 Ravenswood became the first Queensland town to lose its railway connection. A small revival occurred during the 1930s by applying more modern extraction processes to known sites. This did not make much difference to the life of the town and by the 1960s it had reached its lowest ebb with a population of about 70. At this point, tourists began to take a growing interest in the town, studies were made of the buildings and work began to conserve them. In the 1980s the whole town was listed by the Australian Heritage Commission and the National Trust of Queensland. In 1987 Carpentaria Gold Ltd opened a new open cut mine using modern heap leaching processes. The hotels have helped to maintain an economic life in the town and the Railway Hotel now offers accommodation and recreational facilities for the new miners.

The Railway Hotel underwent extensive renovation in 1988. The verandahs were repaired, the building was painted, a hydraulic lift was installed to bring supplies from an old cellar below the footpath, the cold room was removed from a former saloon, the saloon was restored, the front of the old bar was incorporated into a new bar. Furniture throughout the building was restored and the bedrooms were furnished. Further work was done on the building when a grant was made by the Department of Environment in 1996 to allow brick piers to be repaired.

== Description ==
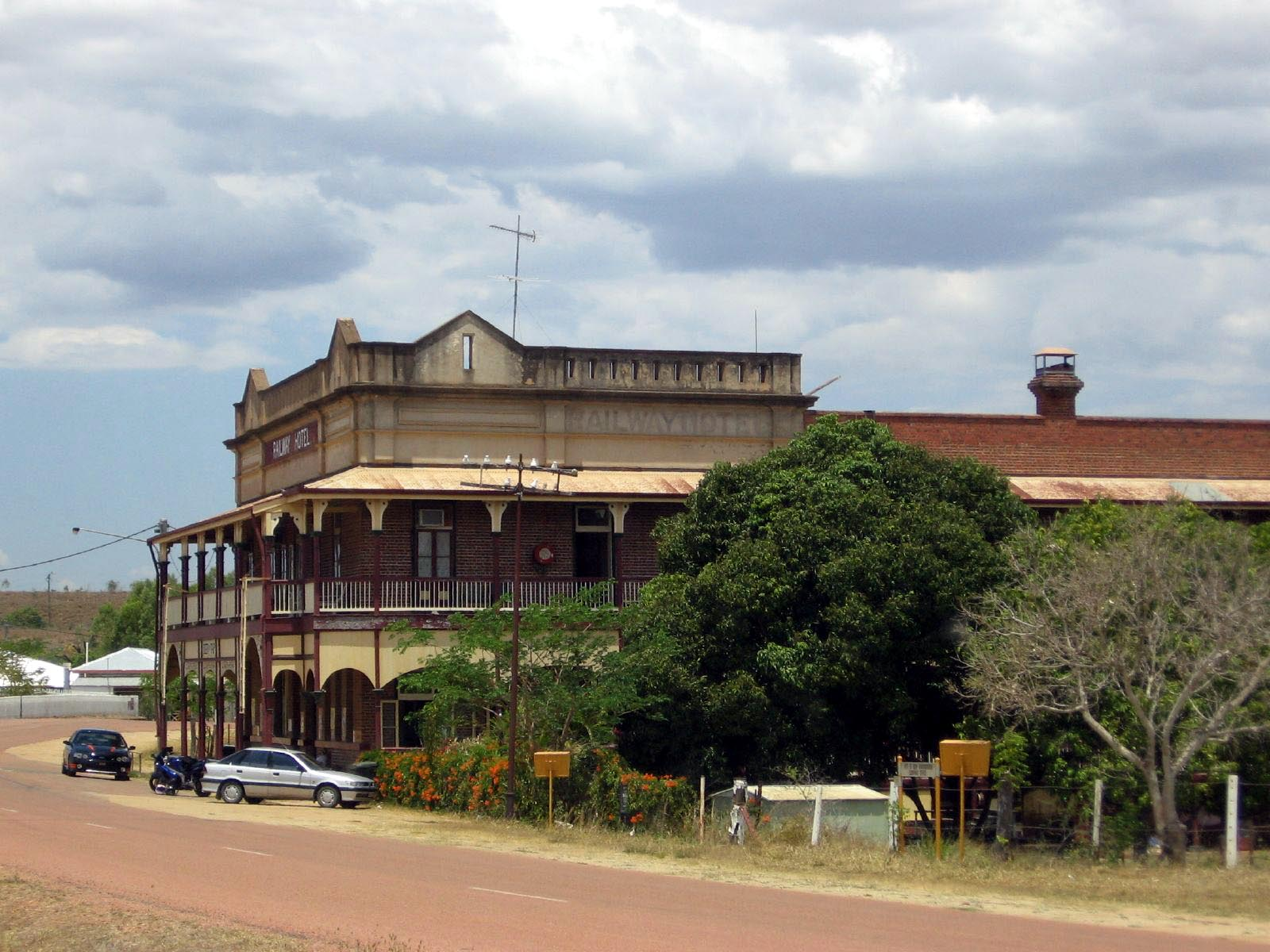
Railway Hotel, 2006

The Railway Hotel, on Barton Street opposite the Court House and the site of the railway station, is one of a handful of buildings left from the town of Ravenswood and is set in a mining landscape which consists of disturbed ground with scattered ruins and mullock heaps, set amongst distinctive chinkee apples and rubber vines.

The Railway Hotel is set on a sloping site which falls away towards Elphinstone Creek at the rear. It has three storeys, only two of which can be seen from street level. The "basement" storey, visible from the side and rear, is set on brick piers. The roof is clad with corrugated iron and is concealed by a rendered brick parapet. The building is constructed of exposed red bricks laid in English bond and is U-shaped in plan with accommodation on the top floor and the bar, kitchens and dining room at street level. On the "basement" level are large rooms used for storage and accommodation for the manager's family.

The street elevation has a two storey verandah which continues around the right side of the building. It is supported by paired posts with fretted timber brackets and dowel balustrades on the first floor and wrought iron valances with arched openings at street level. At the side the verandah has dowel balustrading to both levels. French doors open from the rooms onto the verandahs at the side and there are sash windows at the front.

Internally, the building retains substantial amounts of original fabric including pressed metal ceilings, and some of the original furniture and fittings.

== Heritage listing ==
The Railway Hotel at Ravenswood was listed on the Queensland Heritage Register on 21 October 1992 having satisfied the following criteria.

The place is important in demonstrating the evolution or pattern of Queensland's history.

Gold mining has been important in the development of North Queensland and the Railway Hotel is one of the few buildings remaining from the once important goldfield town of Ravenswood. As an intact and good quality hotel named for and located near the former railway station, it provides evidence of both the prosperity of the field at the turn of the nineteenth century and of its subsequent decline, illustrating a pattern common on nineteenth century goldfields.

The place is important in demonstrating the principal characteristics of a particular class of cultural places.

The Railway Hotel is important as a good example of a quality hotel of its era in form, layout and interior decoration and has well preserved interior and exterior detail. It has had continuity of usage for almost a hundred years.

The place is important because of its aesthetic significance.

The Railway Hotel is a fine example of Federation hotel architecture and as a substantial two storey building, one of only two remaining hotels, is a dominant feature in the town.
