= Ravenswood School and Residence =

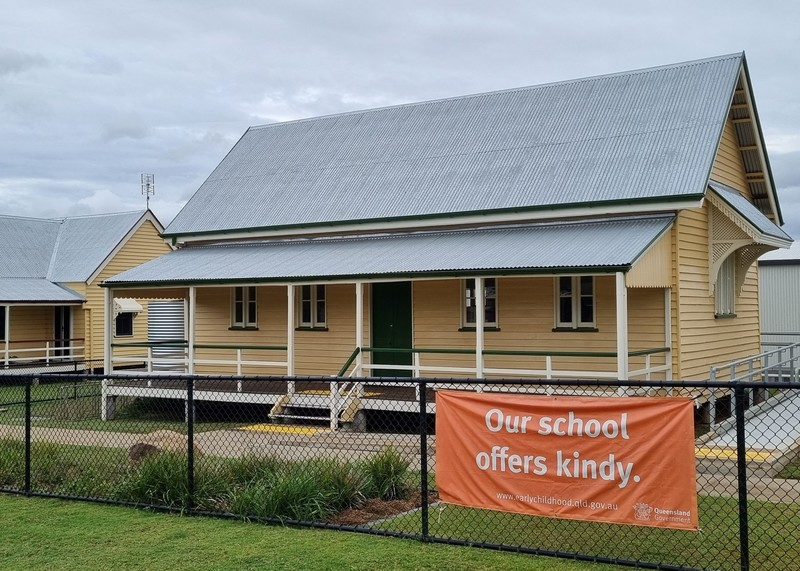
- Ravenswood School on new site in Elphinstone Street, 2022

- Location within Queensland Location within Australia
- 20.1041°S 146.8898°E
- Location: School Street, Ravenswood, Charters Towers Region, Queensland, Australia

History
- Design period: 1870s–1890s (late 19th century)
- Built: 1873–1897

Site notes
- Architectural style: Classicism

Queensland Heritage Register
- Official name: Ravenswood School and Residence
- Type: state heritage (built)
- Designated: 21 October 1992
- Reference no.: 600455
- Significant period: 1870s–1890s (historical); 1870s–1890s (fabric)
- Significant components: school/school room, residential accommodation – headmaster's house

Ravenswood School and Residence is a heritage-listed state school and house originally in School Street, but relocated circa 2019 to 30-40 Elphinstone Street, Ravenswood, Charters Towers Region, Queensland, Australia. The buildings were originally built from 1873 to 1897. They were added to the Queensland Heritage Register on 21 October 1992.

== History ==
The school and residence are components of an educational facility that has served Ravenswood since 1873. The existing early building at Ravenswood School is an 1880s extension of the original school built in 1873 and the residence dates from 1873 with extensions made over the years to accommodate changing needs.

Gold was discovered at Ravenswood in 1868, a few years after pastoral settlement of the area had begun. A tent settlement quickly sprang up and was surveyed in 1870 and gazetted as a town in 1871. Although many miners left for other fields when it was found that the gold at deeper levels was difficult to separate from the ore body, Ravenswood continued to prosper and more families moved into the town as it developed. The need for a school was soon apparent.

At Separation of Queensland from New South Wales at the end of 1859, two National (government) Schools existed in the new colony. In 1860, the Primary Education Act was passed, introducing a comprehensive system of State schools alongside a minimal provision for church schools. A Board of General Education was set up to administer annual grants, assist in building vested schools, and provide teachers. A few National Schools were built under this system, though the financial crisis in 1886 slowed up the project. However, Queensland was the first colony to provide free primary education from January 1870. A Royal Commission on Education in Queensland was set up in 1874 and resulted in a State Education Act which took effect from 1 January 1876 and provided for a Department of Public Instruction under a minister and a system of State primary schools.

In 1872 a Ravenswood School Committee was formed and tenders were called for the construction of a school to meet the needs of the growing community. The government provided a teacher and books, but expected communities with more than 30 potential pupils to put up a third of the school costs. The Committee raised £306/18/- and covered the interim period by holding classes in the old "Emerald Isle Hotel" purchased for the modest sum of £18.

After considerable disagreement between the committee and the Board of Education regarding the cost and suitability of plans provided by each, the school and residence were erected in 1873 and opened in January 1874 as a double classroom school with an enrolment of 70. As the school was constructed prior to the passage of the Queensland State Education Act it was known as the National School of Ravenswood.

The school was initially within a school reserve of 2 acres and 22 perches of Crown Land, however, in 1875 the Ravenswood Divisional Board applied to the Minister for Works and Mines for a further grant of land in anticipation of continuing growth and the need to provide for a future girls' school. In 1887 the north corner of the school reserve was cut off by the Mines Department for street purposes and over the next forty years the boundaries fluctuated, echoing the booms and depression period experienced by Ravenswood.

Ravenswood's economy received a boost in the mid-1880s by the arrival of the Great Northern railway in 1884 and the use of improved means to extract gold from ore. A new generation of public buildings began to replace those from the early days of the field, including a police station and courthouse, post office and hospital. In 1889, the school reached its peak enrolment of almost 400 children. It was extended according to standard plans and by 1905 had 8 classrooms and a gymnasium. Ravenswood enjoyed a boom between 1900 and 1908 as more modern techniques were applied to ore processing. However, the cost of extraction and continued exploration rose as returns fell and after the end of the First World War it became apparent that the field would not pick up again. In the 1920s buildings as well as people moved away from Ravenswood and were relocated to other towns. In 1929 enrolment in the school fell to below 100 and in 1930, Ravenswood became the first town in Queensland to lose its rail connection.

As the population declined the extensions were extensions were progressively removed although the foundations of extensions are still visible. The school is now growing again and has a new classroom block and other facilities.

The school residence is the oldest building in Ravenswood and is thought to be the oldest surviving house in a North Queensland town. Because of its age, the residence predates the standardisation of design which strongly influenced domestic building throughout Queensland; the use of an exposed frame, for example, which was to become prevalent in North Queensland a decade later. The extensions to the residence and the reasons for each extension are fully documented. It remains today almost as it was on completion of the last extension in 1897 and is a catalogue of identifiable nineteen century builders' techniques from 1873 to 1897.

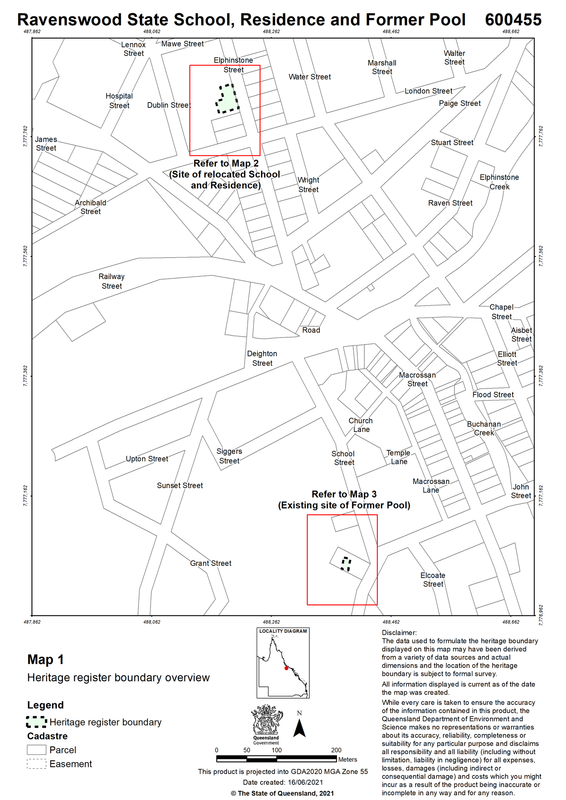
Map showing the old and new locations of the Ravenswood State School and Residence site, 2021

It was constructed originally as a lowset timber-framed house of four rooms under a transverse gabled roof with an internal fireplace for cooking. The walls were clad externally with weatherboards but the interior was unlined. No separate kitchen was constructed and although it is believed that the first teacher appointed ate at a hotel, not an uncommon arrangement where a teacher was a single man, the design was more appropriate to a southern climate. The house was also constructed with only a front verandah, though after a complaint from the secretary of the local committee, a verandah was added to the rear later in 1874. On the appointment in 1877 of a teacher with a large family, a separate kitchen was requested on the grounds that "...this climate does not admit of cooking being done in the midst of sleeping apartments" A building from another site, described as "an old weatherboarded house, shingle roofed", was then attached to the house by a covered way. At some time a section of the rear verandah was enclosed to form a servant's room, possibly at the same time as the addition of the kitchen.

The ceilings of the core section of the house were lined in 1883 and repairs made to storm damage in 1880 and 1884, the brick chimney being demolished following the severe storm of 1884 and not rebuilt, but no major changes were made until 1887 when the old kitchen was replaced by a new structure with a covered way and brick fireplace, the rear verandah room was moved to the other side of the building, a window was cut into the southeast bedroom wall and the core walls were lined internally with tongue-and-groove boards. Hans Thomsen and John Thomas, Ravenswood builders, carried out the alterations.

In 1889, the then head teacher requested "more suitable and worthy accommodation", which reflects the general upgrading of public buildings in Ravenswood during the 1880s and the peak enrolment for that year of 390. The department responded by adding an asymmetrical extension to the front of the house, demolishing the front verandah and constructing an almost square living room with verandahs along the front and one side.

The last extension was made in 1897, when a whole side of the residence was extended by eight feet to the north-east including a verandah on the third side of the living room. The verandahs were ceiled at that time. The house has since been altered only by the arrangement of some internal partitions and partial enclosure of the rear verandah. Externally it remained the same as it was in 1897 and continued to be used as a teacher's residence.

In 2019, an expansion of gold mining required the school and its heritage buildings to be relocated to a new site at 30-40 Elphinstone Street.

== Description ==
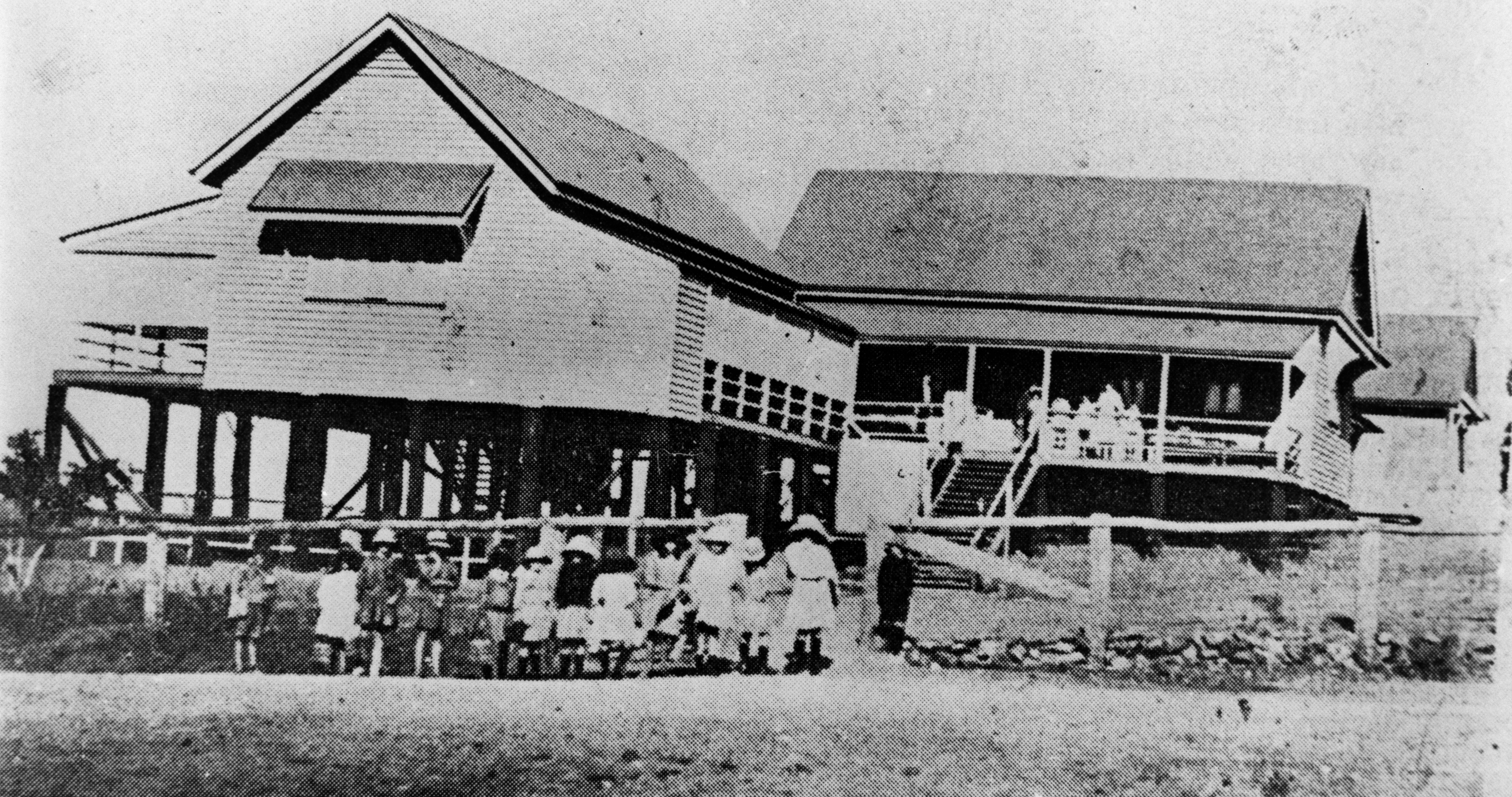
Ravenswood State School

The Ravenswood School and Residence are located on School Street in a prominent position overlooking the town. Ravenswood is situated in a mining landscape which consists of disturbed ground with scattered ruins and mullock heaps, set amongst distinctive chinkee apple trees and rubber vines.

The school is a single storey, rectangular building with its main axis to the street. It has a timber frame clad with weatherboards and is raised on high concrete stumps to create a shaded space underneath. The steeply pitched gabled roof is clad in corrugated iron extending to a skillion roofed verandah at the front and a rear enclosed verandah. The verandahs are supported on timber posts and have timber balustrading.

The residence is a single storey, rectangular house with its main axis to the street. It is timber framed, set on low stumps and clad in weatherboards. Its form is unusual as a result of repeated extensions and it has open verandahs with horizontal balustrades on two sides. The roof is steeply pitched and is multi-gabled and clad with corrugated iron.

== Heritage listing ==
Ravenswood School and Residence was listed on the Queensland Heritage Register on 21 October 1992 having satisfied the following criteria.

The place is important in demonstrating the evolution or pattern of Queensland's history.

The school complex is important as an example of an early school in a remote area, demonstrating the importance placed by government not only on education, but on the contribution made to the economy of the colony by such mining towns as Ravenswood. Its construction, extension and following reduction accurately reflect changes to the size and composition of the population and therefore the development and decline of Ravenswood as a goldfield and township.

The place demonstrates rare, uncommon or endangered aspects of Queensland's cultural heritage.

The Ravenswood School residence, constructed in 1873, is important as the oldest known residential building in a North Queensland town and its plan, roof form and construction details pre-date the standardised forms of later North Queensland houses. It is also the only one of the first government buildings erected on the field to survive.

The place has potential to yield information that will contribute to an understanding of Queensland's history.

Because of their age and the fact that change has been well documented, the buildings, particularly the residence, have the potential to yield information regarding early building techniques and the way in which houses were extended to meet changing needs during the nineteenth and 20th centuries.

The place is important in demonstrating the principal characteristics of a particular class of cultural places.

The Ravenswood school is important as a good representative example of a school of its era and has had long continuity of use. The residence provides an excellent example of the way in which basic houses were enlarged in the Queensland tradition.

The place has a strong or special association with a particular community or cultural group for social, cultural or spiritual reasons.

The School is important for its connection with the community in and around Ravenswood as a provider of public education for several generations.
