= Mabel Mill =

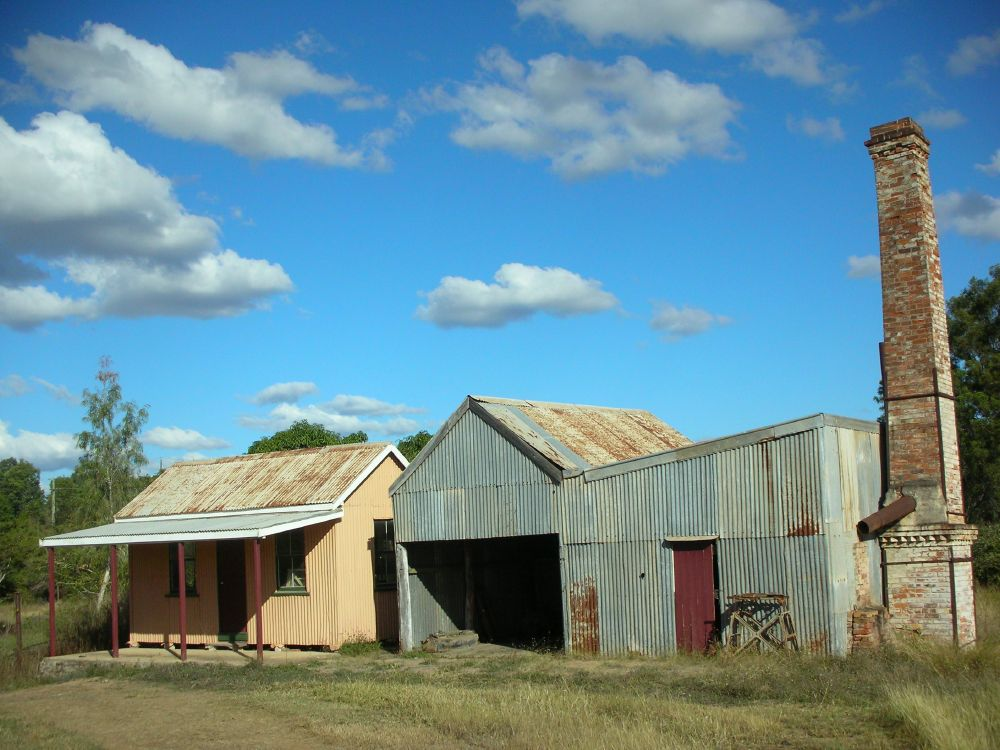
- Office and assay house, 2009

- Location within Queensland Location within Australia
- 20.0996°S 146.8861°E
- Location: Barton Street, Ravenswood, Charters Towers Region, Queensland, Australia

History
- Design period: 1870s–1890s (late 19th century)
- Built: c. 1871–c. 1902

Queensland Heritage Register
- Official name: Mabel Mill (former), Mabel Mill, Partridge Mill
- Type: state heritage (built, archaeological)
- Designated: 28 January 1994
- Reference no.: 601206
- Significant period: c. 1871–1930s (historical)
- Significant components: safe, machinery/plant/equipment – mining/mineral processing, trees/plantings, office/administration building, objects (movable) – mining/mineral processing, assay office, slab/s – concrete, road/roadway, chimney/chimney stack, flue, mounting block/stand, mullock heap

Mabel Mill is a heritage-listed former stamper battery at Barton Street, Ravenswood, Charters Towers Region, Queensland, Australia. It was built from c. 1871 to c. 1902. It is also known as Mabel Mill and Partridge Mill. It was added to the Queensland Heritage Register on 28 January 1994.

== History ==
From the 1850s to the first World War, mining in Queensland was dominated by gold, with major discoveries and consequential "rushes" in such places as Clermont (1861), Gympie (1867), Ravenswood (1868), Charters Towers (1872), Palmer Gold Field (1873), and Mount Morgan (1882). Such discoveries were to make Queensland the third largest producer of gold in Australia, after Western Australia and Victoria.

In the early days, mining at Ravenswood, as with many other gold fields, was restricted to panning the alluvial gold in the gullies of creeks. Later with the establishment of reef mining, it was necessary to set up milling facilities to extract the gold. The Mabel Mill, located on the northern side of Elphinstone Creek, is known to have been established by 1871, by which time there were five mills on the Ravenswood Gold Field with a total of 52 stamps for crushing. The technology used at this time was amalgamation, involving washing the crushed ore over copper plates coated with mercury which amalgamated with the gold, scraping the amalgam off the plates, and driving off the mercury leaving the gold.

By 1871, Ravenswood's troubles had begun; as mines sank beneath the water table it was found that the gold could not easily be extracted from the mundic sulphides. In Ravenswood this caused particular problems due in part to the variety and unpredictability of the distribution of sulphides in the ore. Greater capital was now required to fund the various technologies for extracting the gold. As a result, many miners left for other gold fields, such as the recently discovered Charters Towers field, which was to quickly overtake Ravenswood as a gold producer and most important inland North Queensland town.

Despite the exodus, the town continued; with the building of government infrastructure, such as the opening of the railway from Townsville in 1884 (with the Ravenswood railway station located conveniently opposite the Mabel Mill), new Court House and Police Station (1882), new Post and Telegraph Office (1885), and Hospital (1887); and other public buildings such as the School of Arts Library (c. 1876; dem 1992) and Hall (c. 1880); whilst the economy of the town was funded by mining (on a reduced scale) and the establishment of silver mines at nearby Totley.

The first reported description of the Mabel Mill site is in 1883, when a map shows the Mabel Mill as Machine Area no8 in the name of HH Barton; the site included a machine and crushing plant mill (a ten- stamp mill powered by one twenty-five horse power steam engine), furnace and stack, and a residence. At this time there were thirteen machine areas registered on the Ravenswood Gold Field with the Mining Warden's report recording that the only method in use here (Ravenswood) for dressing mundic ore is by the ordinary stamper mills and rotatory buddles, resulting in a great loss of mineral.

By 1885, the Mabel Mill was owned by "Joske & others", proprietors of the Ravenswood Gold Smelting Co, who had acquired some of the better mines in the town including the Grant, Excelsior, and Black Jack. The intention of the company was to use a smelting process to solve the mundic problem. According to the Warden, the Mabel was equipped with ten head of stamps, one buddle, two wheelers (Chilean mills?), two berdan pans, two arresters (arresteras?), and a reverbatory furnace. On the southern side of the creek, Joske was granted a five-acre lease for depositing slag from his smelters.

Two years later, however, the Mining Warden reported that the methods employed by the Ravenswood Gold Smelting Co had failed and the company's capital was exhausted. The Mill (now renumbered Machine Area 28) was transferred to the Ravenswood Gold Co Ltd, under the management of previous owner, HH Barton, who also acquired the Sunset, General Grant, and Black Jack mines, and later the Melaneur and Duke of Edinburgh. A chlorination process to treat ore was installed which by 1889, was declared a success. The process involved roasting the ore to drive off the sulphur; treating the roasted ore with chlorine gas with the gold combining with the chlorine to form soluble gold chloride, which was then further treated to deposit the gold. Just two years later, however, the Mabel Mill was again in trouble with the Warden reporting that although the technology was successful as a treatment, it was not profitable.

Barton was in financial difficulties with the Banks, who took over the mill and his other extensive mining interests. In 1899, another of Ravenswood's entrepreneurs, Archibald Laurence Wilson, floated the New Ravenswood Co to acquire the assets of Barton's Ravenswood Gold Co. The new company with a capital of £50,000 had its directors in London, but was managed by Wilson. With the investment of English capital, substantial development occurred both in the town and the mines. Wilson's approach to "his companies" was reportedly high handed, but produced substantial (in 1901 and 1902, 50%) dividends for shareholders.

All of the company's acquisitions, including the Mabel Mill, were refurbished. Substantial changes were made to the mill site. Two shaking tables (known as the Wilfley type) were erected in 1901 at the Mill by Wilson, who is credited with introducing this new method of concentrating to Queensland. Under this process the ore was crushed in the stampers (without mercury), the crushed material was concentrated on the Wilfley tables, and the concentrate was sent for recovery of the gold.

Further changes were made the following year. In 1902, a new tailings (raff) wheel, measuring 48 feet (15 m) in diameter, was erected higher up the creek for lifting the tailings (the fine material left after stamp milling and amalgamation) from the stamp batteries housed in a rambling galvanised iron shed on the northern side of the creek to the flume which transported the tailings across the creek onto the recently erected tailings area, where they were treated with cyanide. Cyaniding involved dissolving the gold out of the pulp with potassium cyanide and trickling the resulting solution through zinc shavings to which the gold attaches and smelting into bullion. The axis of the tailings wheel rested on brick pyramid piers sunk into bedrock, concreted, plastered, and painted); the flume was set on high posts the width of creek. Other work included a dam which was put in just below the Mill with the wall made of stone from the Ravenswood Deep Mine acquired by Wilson in 1900; the erection of a 70-foot (21 m) high circular brick chimney stack; addition of new boilers to the steaming power of the battery; and an increase in capacity of the mill to thirty head.

A photo taken c. 1910 shows the complex to comprise the office building of the New Ravenswood Co (removed/demolished c. 1917), assay building, chlorination building (c. 1889), enclosed tailings wheel (1902), concentrate drying shed, road composed of mullock, stamper shed with elevator, main stack to boilers, and residence.

By 1912, the mining industry in Ravenswood was on its last legs; profits of the New Ravenswood Co had dropped substantially and the conditions of mine workers were in issue. The great strike in Ravenswood of 1912–1913 left a bitterly divided community; the mines continued to decline and the outbreak of World War I in 1914 lead to an increase in costs and a scarcity of labour. The town which had reached its peak population of nearly 5,000 people in 1903 was rapidly declining.

In 1917, the New Ravenswood Co went into liquidation, after which it is believed that much of the equipment and buildings were sold by the liquidators. This decline was to be repeated throughout Australia in the post World War I period; with the mining industry not regenerating (albeit in a new form in which coal, aluminium, and iron ore took precedence in the new markets) until after the second World War.

In 1918, a new company, Ravenswood Gold Mines Ltd, took up a portion of the abandoned mining leases of New Ravenswood; ore was sent to the Venus State Battery at Charters Towers for treatment. The Mabel Mill continued to provide crushing services for the reduced scale of local mining. A 1920 map shows the Mabel Mill (renumbered as Machine Area 203) with a significantly reduced area of 3 roods (33,000 sq ft; 3,000 m^{2}) 8 perches (200 m^{2}). The formation of the new company, however, did little to arrest the rapid slide of Ravenswood (and the Mill) from its short period of glory. In the following years, mining in the town continued, but the boom was over: much of the population moved away, a number of buildings were removed, and in 1930 Ravenswood became the first Queensland town to lose its railway.

A small revival occurred during the 1930s (Partridge and Ralston established a mill on the southern side of the creek of the Mabel Mill site to treat old tailings) and early 1940s and later revivals as new technology allowed for economical mining of lower grade ores, but Ravenswood never returned to the prosperity of the early 1900s and was not rebuilt.

The minor buildings on the site lasted until after World War II and by 1960, the site was virtually as seen today, apart from the more recent removal to the site of a collection of machinery. Since the 1970s, numerous studies of the Ravenswood area have been completed; in the 1980s the whole town was listed by the Australian Heritage Commission and the National Trust of Queensland. This period also saw the commencement of open cut gold mining by Carpentaria Gold Pty Ltd and the growth of cultural tourism in the town.

== Description ==
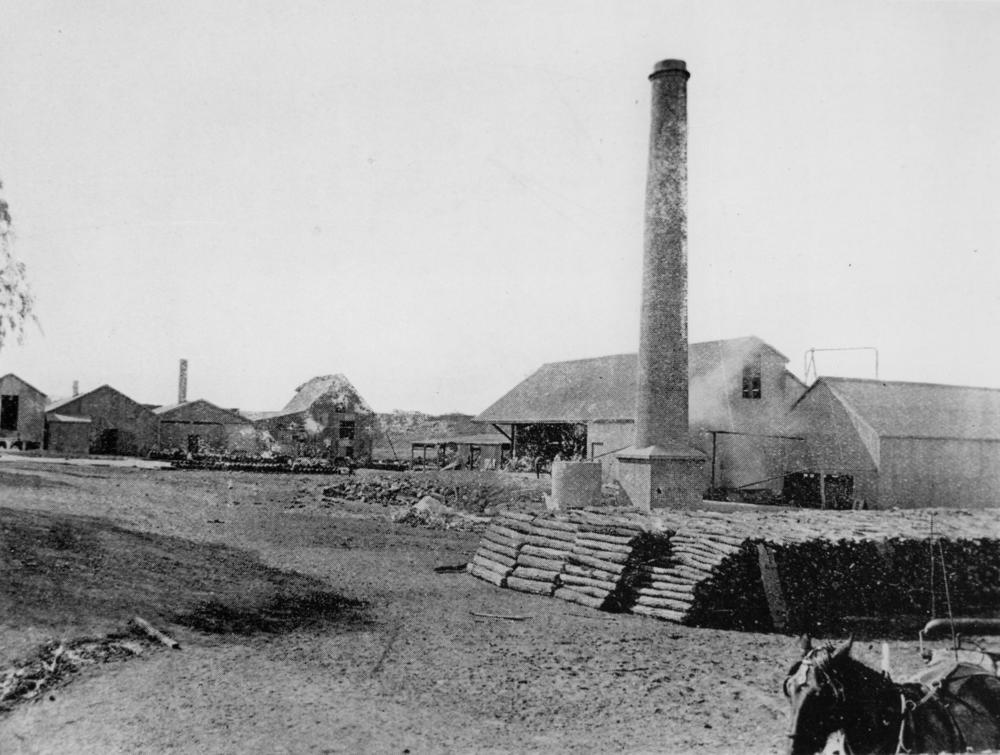
Mabel Mill mine, 1903

The Mabel Mill, located near the town centre of Ravenswood and bounded by Elphinstone Creek to the south and Barton Street to the north, consists of the remains of a complex of buildings associated with the processing of gold, and to a lesser extent silver. Ravenswood is located in a mining landscape, which consists of disturbed ground with scattered ruins and mullock heaps, set amongst distinctive chinky apples and rubber vines.

The site includes the following remains:

- In the centre of the site, a mullock road formation entranced from Barton Street which encircles the slab of the concentrate drying shed. The mullock road formation includes a shallow pit on the eastern side, which was probably the casing for a weighbridge. The concentrate drying shed, which has a wedge shaped plan, consists of a slab with post holes showing its original structure. Construction of the slab is by a cement sand screed over a rubble base.
- To the northeast, a general machinery display area on the site of the New Ravenswood Company office. The machinery display area includes a number of mining artefacts and machinery gathered from the Ravenswood Gold Field. Nothing remains of the New Ravenswood Company office.
- To the east, a safe, assay house and office. Roughly square in plan, the safe is a single-storeyed masonry building, with the perimeter wall built around a timber pole structure. The assay house is a single-storeyed timber pole structure with corrugated iron cladding to walls and roof. The building has a masonry chimney stack on the western end, and internally it contains two furnaces. The office is a single-storeyed timber-framed building with corrugated iron cladding to walls and roof. The building has lean-to structures on the north and south.
- To the southeast, the sites of the chlorination works and cyanide tailings. The site of the chlorination works contain the remains of its footings. The site of the cyanide tailings includes areas of brick paving.
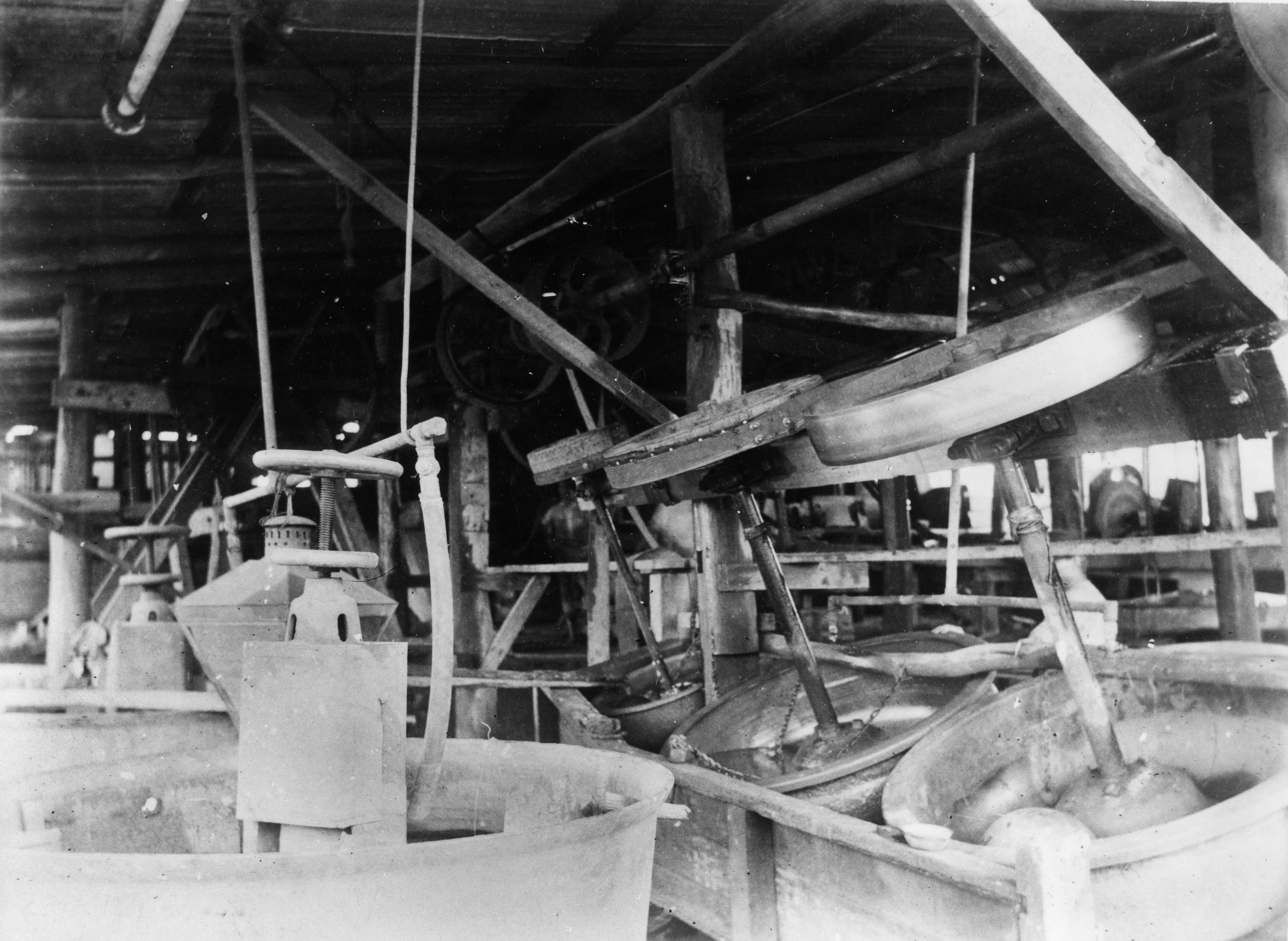
- Interior of the crushing works, circa 1897
  To the south, the stampers, boiler footings, base of stack and tailings wheel piers. From the original, only one head of stamps remain. This has timber framing and a concrete pad and timber butt base, with the surviving stamps branded with the name BRAND AND DRYBOROUGH. The footings of the boiler, used to drive the engine for the stamps and power the steam pump which drew from a well on the flank of the creek, are located at the base of the brick chimney stack. The remains of the tailings wheel, which lifted the tailings via a flume over Elphinstone Creek to the tailings area, consist of the two supporting rendered masonry piers, one of which has fallen on its side.
- To the southwest, the stack and flues, sites of the engine room and boiler house. The stack is a tall cylindrical masonry chimney on a square base. The remains of the flues to the south of this consist of four brick pipes, sections of which are damaged and bricks are scattered, leading to the former boiler house further to the south. The boiler house, which generated power for the mill, is survived by a line of steel posts marking the northern wall, and brick and concrete beds mark the location of the main engine room for the mill.
- To the northwest, the slab of a residence and stand of trees. The rendered slab is located between Mango trees, with Burdekin Plums and Date Palms nearby.

== Heritage listing ==
The former Mabel Mill was listed on the Queensland Heritage Register on 28 January 1994 having satisfied the following criteria.

The place is important in demonstrating the evolution or pattern of Queensland's history.

As a symbol of the varying fortunes of Ravenswood, the former Mabel Mill, both in spite of and because of its state of ruin, is one of the most significant sites in the town. At the same time, by its very nature as a ruin (which is such a part of the pattern of the contemporary Ravenswood townscape), it provides tangible evidence of the often mercurial nature of a community dependent on finite mineral wealth.

The place is important in demonstrating the principal characteristics of a particular class of cultural places.

As a ruin, the site still retains sufficient physical evidence to demonstrate some of the processes employed to overcome the problem of extracting gold in the Ravenswood area.

The place has a special association with the life or work of a particular person, group or organisation of importance in Queensland's history.

The history of the site is linked to those of HH Barton (Ravenswood Gold Co) and AL Wilson (New Ravenswood Co), two of the town's most notable entrepreneurs and companies associated with the development of the gold mining industry in North Queensland, which gave significant impetus to the economic and social development of the region.
