= Shire of Ravenswood =

Local government area of Queensland, Australia

Coordinates: 20.08°S 146.85°E

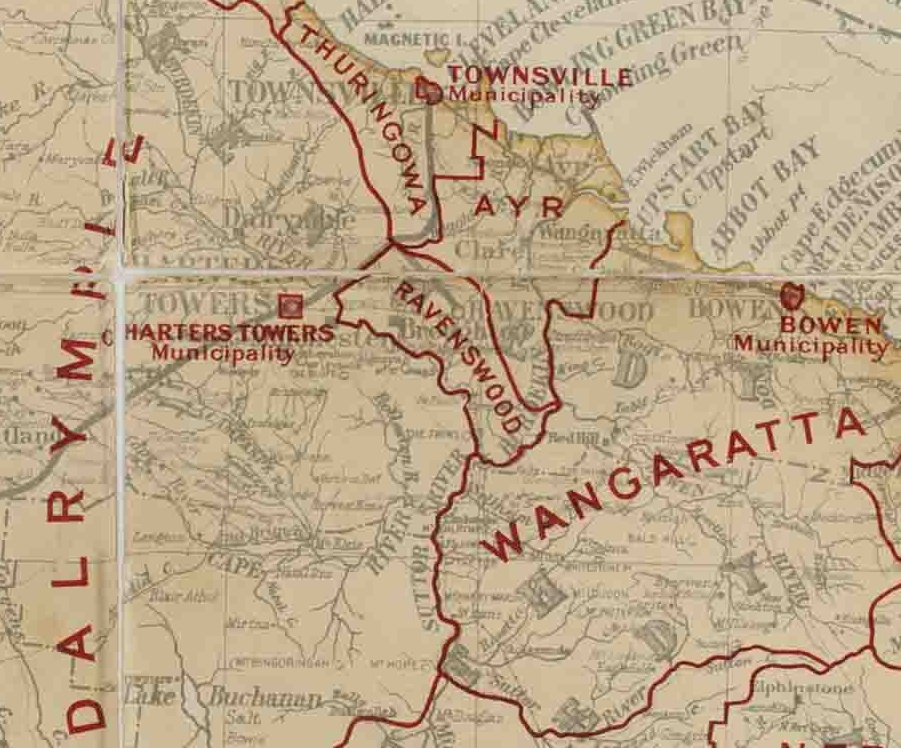
Map of Ravenswood Division and adjacent local government areas, March 1902

The Shire of Ravenswood was a local government area located in North Queensland, Australia. Its administrative centre was in Ravenswood.

== History ==
Ravenswood Division was created on 11 November 1879 as one of 74 divisions around Queensland under the Divisional Boards Act 1879 with a population of 1412.

On 18 January 1882, the subdivisions were abolished (meaning all of board members would be elected by all residents rather than having representatives from different parts of the division).

With the passage of the Local Authorities Act 1902, the Ravenswood Division became the Shire of Ravenswood on 31 March 1903.

However, with the decline in Ravenwood's population after World War I, it became increasingly financially unviable to have a separate local government authority. On 1 January 1930, the Shire of Ravenswood was abolished and absorbed into the Shire of Dalrymple as its No. 3 division.

On 15 March 2008, under the Local Government (Reform Implementation) Act 2007 passed by the Parliament of Queensland on 10 August 2007, the Shire of Dalrymple was amalgamated with the separate City of Charters Towers to form the Charters Towers Region.

== Chairmen ==
- 1927: Joseph Podosky
