= Burdekin (disambiguation) =

Burdekin may refer to:

== People ==
- Burdekin (surname)

== Places ==
- Shire of Burdekin, Queensland, Australia
- Electoral district of Burdekin, Queensland, Australia; of the Queensland legislature
- Townsville-Burdekin School District, Burdekin Shire, Queensland, Australia
- Burdekin River, Queensland, Australia; a river
- Burdekin Valley, Queensland, Australia; a river valley containing the Burdekin River
- Burdekin Falls, Queensland, Australia; an uncontrolled weir spillover falls on the eponymous river at the Burdekin Falls Dam
- Burdekin Gap, Queensland, Australia; a biogeographic divide

== Facilities and structures ==
- Burdekin Falls Dam, Queensland, Australia; a dam on the Burdekin River
- Burdekin Bridge, Queensland, Australia; a road bridge over the eponymous river
- Burdekin River Rail Bridge, Queensland, Australia; a heritage-listed bridge over the eponymous river
- Burdekin Catholic High School, Ayr, Queensland, Australia

== Other uses ==
- HMAS Burdekin, an Australian navy ship name
  - HMAS Burdekin (K376), a WWII-era River-class frigate
- Burdekin plum (Pleiogynium timoriense), a fruit tree
- Burdekin duck (Radjah radjah), a shelduck

== See also ==
- Burdekin River Pumping Station, Breddan, Charters Towers Region, Queensland, Australia; a pumping station on the eponymous river and heritage listed building
- Burdekin Shire Council Chambers, Ayr, Queensland, Australia; a heritage-listed building
- Lower Burdekin languages, Australian Aboriginal languages found along the Burdekin River
