= Hann Family Grave =

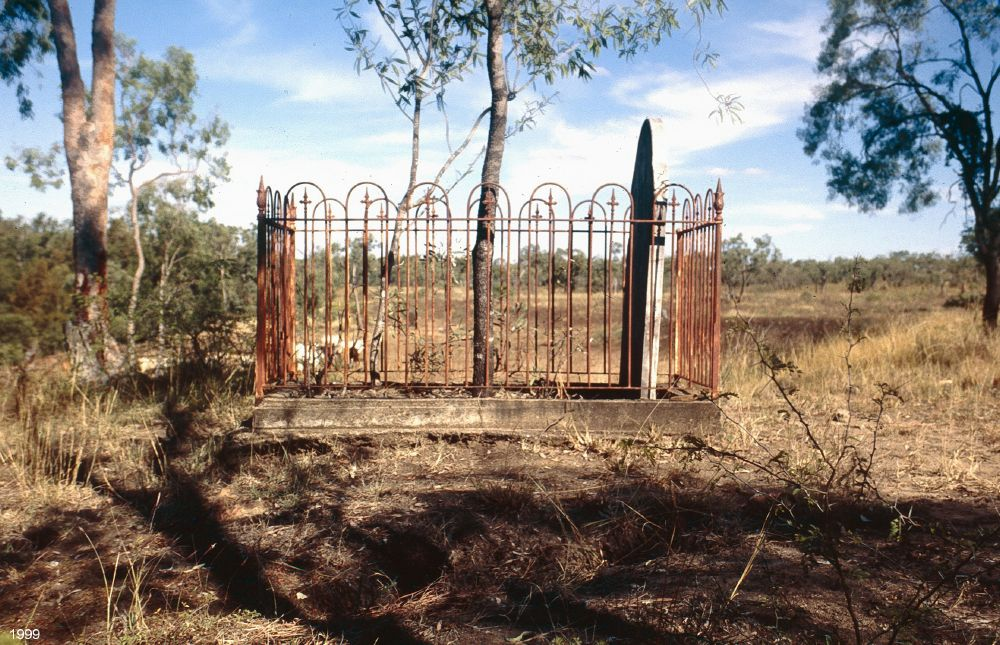
- Hann Family Grave, 1999

- Location within Queensland Location within Australia
- 19.6875°S 145.5407°E
- Location: Bluff Downs Station, Basalt, Charters Towers Region, Queensland, Australia

History
- Design period: 1840s - 1860s (mid-19th century)
- Built: 1864 - 1865

Queensland Heritage Register
- Official name: Hann Family Grave
- Type: state heritage (built)
- Designated: 24 June 1999
- Reference no.: 601789
- Significant period: 1860s (fabric)
- Significant components: headstone, grave surrounds/railings, burial/grave

Hann Family Grave is a heritage-listed cemetery at Bluff Downs Station, Basalt, Charters Towers Region, Queensland, Australia. It was built from 1864 to 1865. It was added to the Queensland Heritage Register on 24 June 1999.

== History ==
The Kennedy District was the first area settled by Europeans in North Queensland. The district was officially proclaimed open for settlement on 1 January 1861. Early pastoralists, encouraged by the success of the Australian wool industry, sought land in the district for sheep raising.

One of the earliest settlers was Joseph Hann. The Hann family had emigrated from Wiltshire in 1851, taking up land on the Mornington Peninsula, Victoria. Family stories indicate that Joseph and his family were not satisfied with the quality of the land they had settled and, encouraged by the buoyant wool industry, decided to follow other Victorian pastoralists moving into North West Queensland.

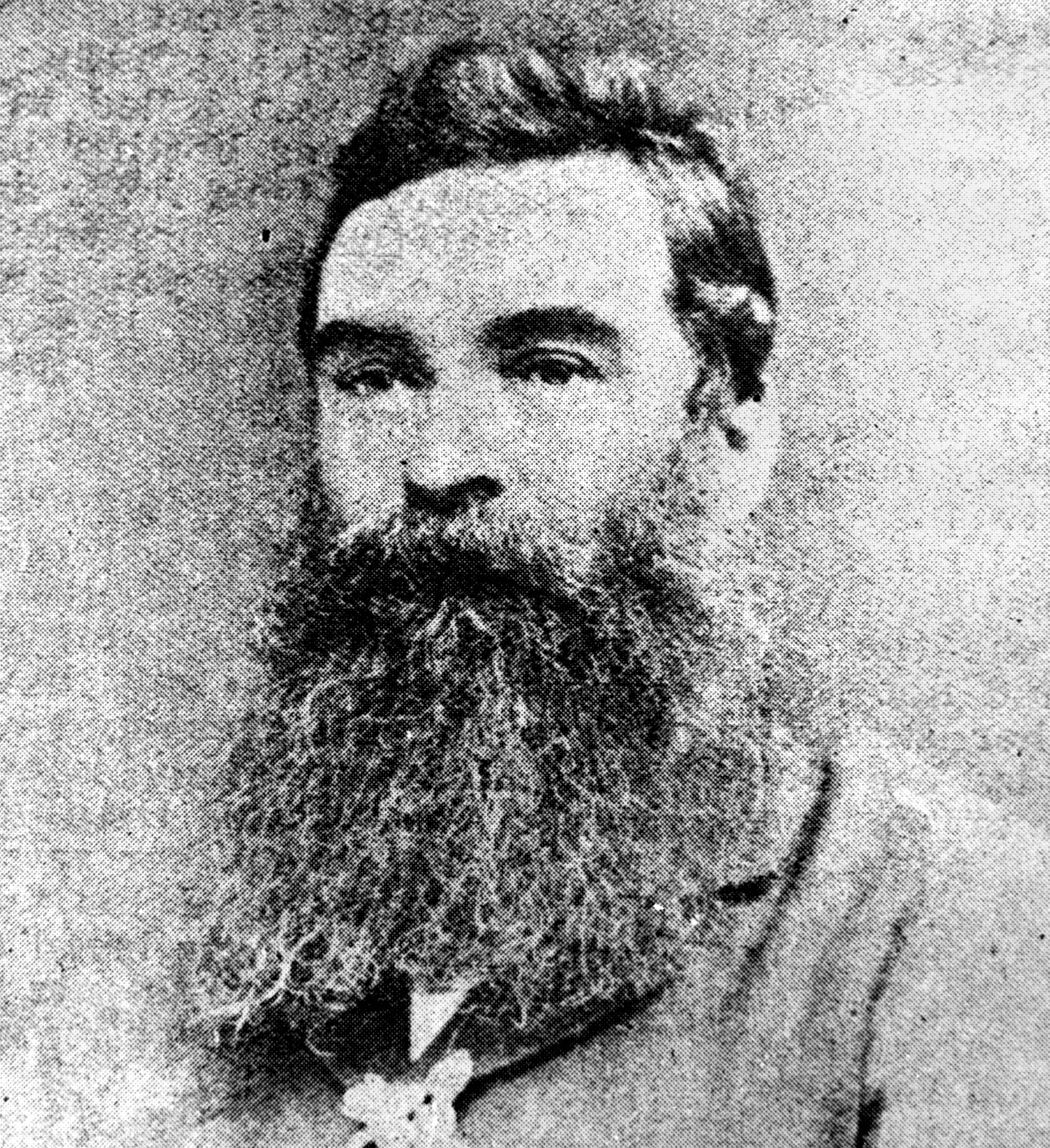
William Hann

Joseph and his son, John sailed to Rockhampton. There they met with William Hann, who had travelled independently to Rockhampton, bought horses and equipment and travelled overland to Port Denison where they arrived in February 1862. On arrival at the port Joseph, finding that the entire land north to Rockingham Bay and along the Burdekin Valley had been selected, decided to explore the area west of the Burdekin.

During a two-month exploration trip the Hanns selected ten runs on the plateau country west of the Burdekin. Joseph Hann described the runs as "fine sheep country, lagoons, waterholes, beautiful volcanic tablelands".

Joseph and his sons returned south to sell their Victorian property. However, before they could purchase sufficient sheep for the stations the market was drained of stock as a result of the demand created by pastoralists heading north and by the demand for meat on the Victorian gold fields. In order to fulfil the stocking requirements of their lease Joseph and William travelled to the Darling Downs where they purchased 3000 head of cattle and arranged for James Gibson and William Glen Walker to stock Hann land to meet the government requirements with a further 2700 head of cattle.

The Hanns arrived with their stock at Bluff Downs in February 1863 after an epic overland journey of six months. During the next two years they were occupied with establishing their stations. Despite their venture into beef, wool production was still a priority so Joseph began replacing cattle with sheep at the earliest opportunity. The decision to restock with sheep was probably a sound one, made for practical reasons. Unlike other pastoral products wool could be stored without spoiling and was relatively light to transport, while meat, the principal product of cattle could not be stored.

By 1864 the Hann family began experiencing the benefits of their pastoral venture. However, that year was to be a sad one for the family. In January Joseph Hann drowned in the Burdekin River while crossing near the small town of Dalrymple. William and the rest of the family continued their pioneering work although Elizabeth Hann did not recover from the shock of her husband's death. Her health declined and she died on 24 June 1864. William and Mary also lost a child, William, in February 1865 on Bluff Downs. Although it is believed that Joseph's body was not recovered after he drowned, Elizabeth and baby William are known to be buried on the bank of the Basalt River below the Bluff Downs Homestead.

In order to finance their pastoral empire, the Hanns had taken three partners into their venture before leaving Victoria. Richard Daintree who worked for the Geology Survey of Victoria and Melbourne financiers Rivett Henry Bland and Edward Klingender. In 1864 Richard Daintree arrived to help run Maryvale Station with the Hanns. William Hann retaining control of the partnership operations in Queensland. Richard Daintree had previously visited Maryvale Station in 1863, but perhaps prompted by the death of Joseph Hann terminated his employ in Melbourne and moved to Queensland to look after his investment. His passions though were photography and geology, and so he managed to spend part of his time exploring and surveying.

Despite the early promise of the land west of the Burdekin, the Hanns found that the country was subject to drought. The mid 1860s were difficult years with drought and a slump in the economy, and it wasn't until the discovery of gold in western Queensland, thanks to Richard Daintree at Cape River in 1867, that the family could see that their pastoral venture was likely to be successful.

In 1868 Richard Daintree was appointed first government geologist for North Queensland and in 1869 he accepted the position of Queensland Agent General in London. Thus the partnership of Hann, Bland, Daintree and Klingender was dissolved in April 1869.

The dissolution of the Hann & Co partnership was the beginning of several changes in the family's life. Despite the more readily available markets for meat on the recently discovered gold fields, squatters were finding that the raising of sheep was not profitable. By 1870 William Hann and his neighbours had to concede that sheep were quite unsuited to the Kennedy. In November William left Maryvale station with 19,000 sheep. He collected an additional 6,000 head from his neighbours Mitchell and Stenhouse on Niall Station for the long trek to markets in the south. The droving trip was an epic journey, which ended in central Victoria eleven months later.

After the dissolution of the partnership the Hann family decided to consolidate their holdings by purchasing Maryvale outright from the remaining partners while, at the same time, selling their share in Bluff Downs. The Bluff was sold in mid December 1871 after William completed the sale of the sheep from the stations.

After his return from the south in 1872 the Queensland Government asked William Hann to lead an expedition to explore Cape York Peninsula. The party reported on geological phenomena and potential pastoral country while paying particular attention to the search for payable minerals. During the trip gold was found at the Palmer River which led to a rush in 1873. At the height of the rush the Palmer Gold Field had a population of over 30,000, thus creating a new market for the Kennedy squatters which ensured their survival.

After William's remarkable trip south and his successful exploration trip to Cape York the family moved to Maryvale Station and restocked with cattle. Further discoveries of gold in North Queensland and the subsequent opening up of markets for meat in the 1870s ensured that the station became a viable pastoral holding and the Hann family were able to lay the foundations of a pastoral tradition which continues to the present day on Maryvale.

With the consolidation of the family holdings and the years of prosperity following the discovery of gold William found time to make a contribution to the local community. He became a foundation member of the Townsville Hospital Board, the Townsville Race Club and Show Society. He contributed £1000 to the construction of St James Cathedral, Townsville and served in local government.

William Hann died at the age of fifty-two in a drowning accident off The Strand, Townsville.

== Description ==
Bluff Downs Station is a cattle property in the northern part of the Kennedy District of Queensland, situated about 150 kilometres (93 mi) northwest of Charters Towers. The Basalt River approximately bisects the station. North of the river are open undulating black soil downs, and south are red basalt tablelands.

The Bluff Downs homestead sits on a bend on the river. The grave site is located about 1 kilometre (0.62 mi) below the Bluff Downs homestead on the western bank of the Basalt River. It is situated on a "bluff" of land about 5 metres (16 ft) above the river. The bluff is suffering substantial erosion at the base.

The grave site is shaded by a scatter of eucalypts on the edge of a small plateau running towards the river. There is one prominent grave site remaining, that of members of the Hann family. It has a base platform of concrete, enclosed by an iron palisade fence with a white marble headstone. The grave faces the river. The fence has cast iron cross spearheads within arches, with corner posts of tulips with cast heads. There are some saplings sprouting from the grave.

The inscription of the headstone reads:

"Sacred to the memory of Joseph Hann who was drowned in the Burdekin River, January 4th 1864 aged 49 years. Elizabeth his wife died June 24th 1864 Aged 54 years. Also of William, son of William and Mary Hann died in February 1865 aged 2 weeks".

Beside this site, is a neat pile of decorative ironwork with concrete bases, being the remnants of fence of a grave site.

== Heritage listing ==
Hann Family Grave was listed on the Queensland Heritage Register on 24 June 1999 having satisfied the following criteria.

The place is important in demonstrating the evolution or pattern of Queensland's history.

The Hann Family Grave, situated on Bluff Downs Station the pastoral home of the Hann family, is a memorial to three members of the pioneering Hann family who arrived in the Kennedy District of North Queensland during the first years of European settlement. Joseph Hann and his sons William and John were leading figures in the process of exploration and pastoral settlement in the Kennedy Region of north Queensland. William, commissioned by the Queensland Government in the 1870s, led an exploration trip to Cape York during which he discovered gold on the Palmer River. Early pastoralist and explorer William Hann, son of Joseph and Elizabeth and father of baby William, became a prominent member of the North Queensland community.

The place has a special association with the life or work of a particular person, group or organisation of importance in Queensland's history.

The Hann Family Grave, situated on Bluff Downs Station the pastoral home of the Hann family, is a memorial to three members of the pioneering Hann family who arrived in the Kennedy District of North Queensland during the first years of European settlement. Joseph Hann and his sons William and John were leading figures in the process of exploration and pastoral settlement in the Kennedy Region of north Queensland. William, commissioned by the Queensland Government in the 1870s, led an exploration trip to Cape York during which he discovered gold on the Palmer River. Early pastoralist and explorer William Hann, son of Joseph and Elizabeth and father of baby William, became a prominent member of the North Queensland community.
