= Dotswood, Queensland =

Dotswood
- Suburb
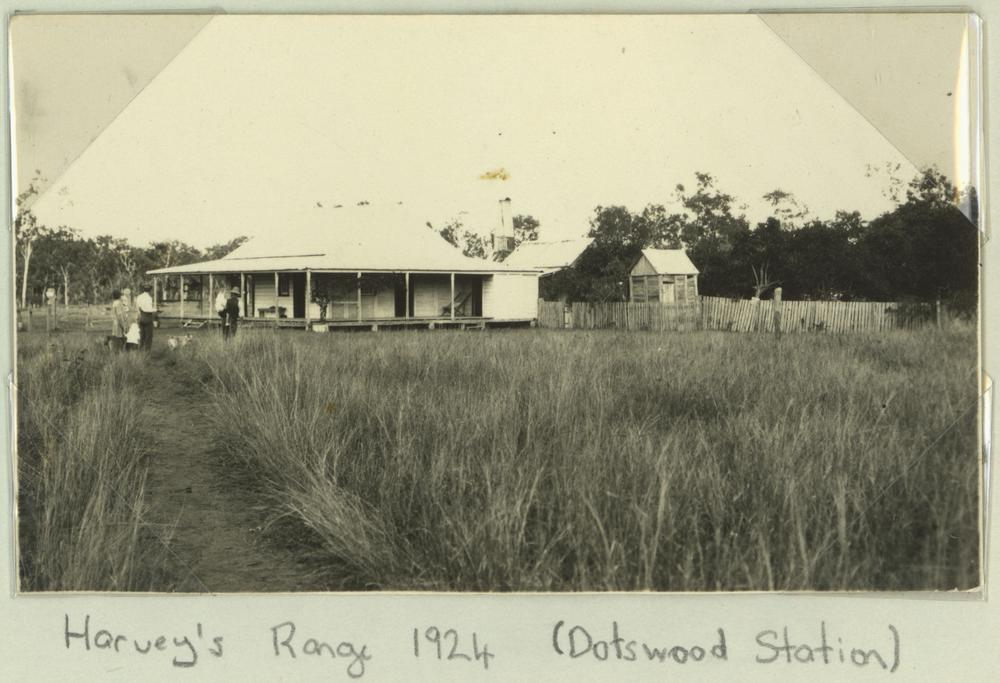
- Dotswood Station homestead, 1924

- Interactive map of Dotswood
- Coordinates: 19.5602°S 146.2202°E
- Country: Australia
- State: Queensland
- LGA: Charters Towers Region
- Location: 24 km (15 mi) NE of Charters Towers; 116 km (72 mi) SW of Townsville; 1,329 km (826 mi) NW of Brisbane

Government
  - State electorate: Traeger
  - Federal division: Kennedy

Area
  - Total: 3,370.6 km^{2} (1,301.4 sq mi)

Population
  - Total: 83 (2021 census)
  - Density: 0.02462/km^{2} (0.0638/sq mi)
- Time zone: UTC+10:00 (AEST)
- Postcode: 4820
Suburbs around Dotswood
Basalt	Paluma	Hervey Range
Basalt	Dotswood	Granite Vale
Breddan	Ravenswood	Mingela

Dotswood is a rural locality in the Charters Towers Region, Queensland, Australia. In the 2021 census, Dotswood had a population of 83 people.

== Geography ==
The neighbourhood of Macrossan is located in the west of the locality beside the bridge over the Burdekin River.

The Great Northern Railway passes through the locality. There are a number of abandoned railway stations on that line within the locality:

- Macrossan railway station (20.0051°S 146.4456°E)
- Exley railway station (19.9515°S 146.5224°E)
- Eneby railway station (19.9225°S 146.5563°E)

Another abandoned station is Keelbottom railway station (19.4427°S 146.3168°E) on the now-closed Greenvale railway line.

The Hervey Range Developmental Road runs through from east to west.

== History ==
In 1863 Phillip Somer and Matthew Hervey were granted the license to occupy the 42 square miles (110 square kilometres) and 25 square miles (65 km^{2}) of the Keelbottom and Watershed Pastoral Runs respectively, by the Crown Lands Office in Brisbane. By late 1865 these men had transferred their holdings of the Emysland, Dotswood, Nursiedob, Keelbottom, Watershed, and Tala (or Tula).runs to the Bank of New South Wales. These properties lay on one or both sides of Keelbottom Creek. Eventually Dotswood Station comprised the runs of Arthurs Peak, Back Plains, Hardwick, Pall Mall, Poon Boon, Redyke (or Red Dyke), Smiths Brook and Yallock Vale, as well as those already mentioned.

The neighbourhood of Macrossan takes its name from the Macrossan railway station, which in turn is named after the politician John Murtagh Macrossan.

This locality was within the Star River Mineral Field, which was discovered in 1865. The following year John Macrossan passed through the area. The Ravenswood Gold Field, discovered in 1868, eventually extended north into the Star River Mineral Field. From 1881 silver-lead deposits in the Ravenswood mining district, the most promising at Argentine, were being mined in what was called a silver mania. However this ended suddenly in 1883, after the failure of a locally capitalized smelting works and low returns.

In late 1872 1,100 acres (450 hectares) on Keelbottom Creek, Kennedy district were reserved for the town reserve of Boolangalla.

In the town of Argentine, 67 town lots, at £16 per acre, and 3 mineral selections, were offered for sale by the Crown Lands Office in October 1882. By the next year the town consisted of several public houses, one butcher's shop, a baker's shop, three stores and two gardens. In December 1888 the name of the Star River Post Office was changed to Argentine Post Office.

== Demographics ==
In the 2016 census, Dotswood had a population of 101 people.

In the 2021 census, Dotswood had a population of 83 people.

== Heritage listings ==
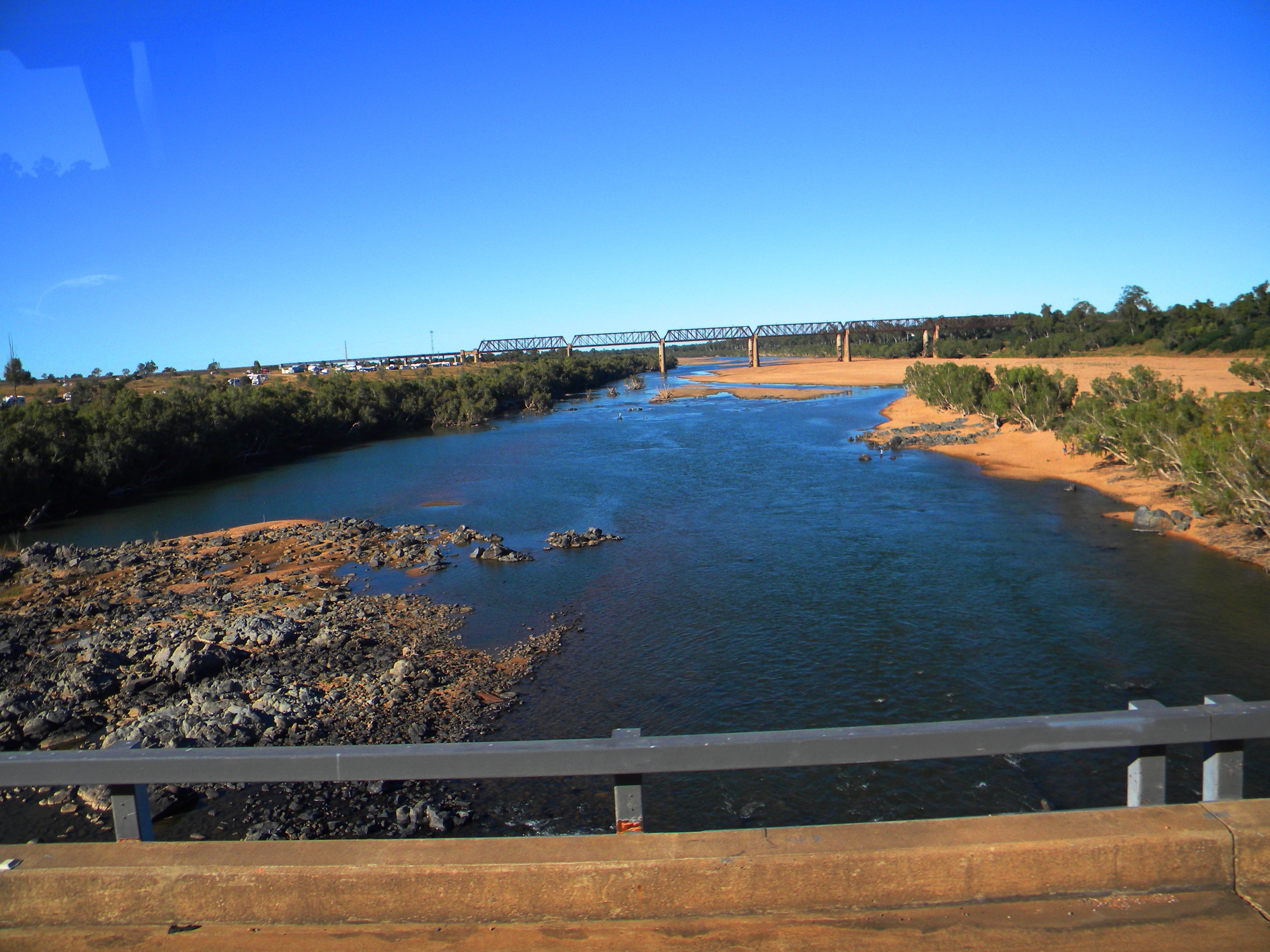
Burdekin River crossing on the Flinders Highway looking towards the railway bridge, 2013.

Dotswood has a number of heritage-listed sites, including:

- Macrossan Stores Depot Group, Flinders Highway, Macrossan
- Burdekin River Rail Bridge, Great Northern railway

== Economy ==
Most of this locality is within of the Department of Defence's Townsville Field Training Area.

== Education ==
There are no schools in Dotswood. For students living in southern Dotswood, the nearest government primary school is Richmond Hill State School in Richmond Hill, Charters Towers, and the nearest government secondary school is Charters Towers State High School in the Charters Towers CBD. For students living in eastern Dotswood, the nearest government primary school is The Willows State School in Kirwan, Townsville, and the nearest government secondary school is Thuringowa State High School in Condon, Townsville. For students living in other parts of Dotswood, there are no nearby schools; the alternatives are distance education and boarding school.

There are non-government schools in Charters Towers and Townsville.

== Amenities ==
Macrossan Park is a free campground overlooking the Burdekin River, situated between the rail and road bridges (20.0034°S 146.4389°E)

== Attractions ==
Surgeons Lookout is a tourist attraction (19.6864°S 146.5387°E).
