= HMAS Burdekin =

Warship

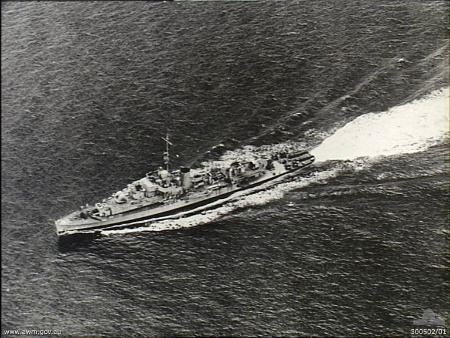
- HMAS Burdekin

History

Australia
- Name: Burdekin
- Namesake: Burdekin River
- Builder: Walkers Limited, Maryborough
- Launched: 30 June 1943
- Commissioned: 27 June 1944
- Decommissioned: 18 April 1946
- Honours and awards: Battle honours: Pacific 1944–45; Borneo 1945
- Fate: Sold for scrap
- Badge

General characteristics
- Class & type: River-class frigate
- Displacement: 1,420 long tons (1,440 t; 1,590 short tons); 2,020 long tons (2,050 t; 2,260 short tons) (deep load)
- Length: 283 ft (86.26 m) p/p; 301.25 ft (91.82 m)o/a
- Beam: 36.5 ft (11.13 m)
- Draught: 9 ft (2.74 m); 13 ft (3.96 m) (deep load)
- Propulsion: 2 × Admiralty 3-drum boilers, 2 shafts, reciprocating vertical triple expansion, 5,500 ihp (4,100 kW)
- Speed: 20 knots (37 km/h; 23 mph)
- Range: 500 long tons (510 t; 560 short tons) oil fuel; 5,180 nautical miles (9,590 km; 5,960 mi) at 12 knots (22 km/h; 14 mph)
- Complement: 140
- Armament: 2 × QF 4 in (102 mm) /45 Mk.XVI, single mounts HA/LA Mk.XX; 8 × QF 20 mm Oerlikon, single mounts Mk.III, later; 3 × QF 40 mm Bofors, single mounts Mk.VII; 4 × QF 20 mm Oerlikon, twin mounts Mk.V; 1 × Hedgehog 24 spigot A/S projector; up to 50 depth charges

HMAS Burdekin (K376) was a River-class frigate that served the Royal Australian Navy (RAN) from 1944 to 1946. She was named for the Burdekin River in Queensland and was one of twelve River-class frigates built for the RAN during World War II.

== Construction ==
Burdekin was launched at Walkers Limited, Maryborough on 30 June 1943 and commissioned on 27 June 1944. Her patron was K. Collings, daughter of Senator Joe Collings, Minister for the Interior and Leader of the Government in the Senate.

== Operational history ==
=== World War II ===
Burdekin was posted to New Guinean waters in October 1944. From November 1944 to May 1945, she escorted convoys travelling between New Guinea and the Philippines. In May 1945, she supported the Australian landing at Tarakan and carried out surveillance operations in the Borneo and Celebes areas.

The frigate was awarded the battle honours "Pacific 1944–45" and "Bornero 1945" for her wartime service.

=== Post-war ===
After a refit in Sydney, Burdekin operated in the Netherlands East Indies following the end of the war. The Japanese surrender of Dutch Borneo was accepted on board the ship by Major General Milford of the 7th Australian Division, on 8 September 1945 and the ship later participated in occupation duties off Borneo and Macassar.

== Decommissioning and fate ==
HMAS Burdekin returned to Australia in January 1946 and was paid off from the RAN and placed in reserve on 18 April 1946.

She was declared for disposal on 9 November 1960 and sold for scrap to the Tolo Mining and Smelting Company of Hong Kong on 21 September 1961.
