= Macrossan Stores Depot Group =

- Location within Queensland
- 20.0083°S 146.4882°E
- Location: Finders Highway, Macrossan (Dotswood), Charters Towers Region, Queensland, Australia

Commonwealth Heritage List
- Official name: Macrossan Stores Depot Group
- Type: Listed place (Historic)
- Designated: 22 June 2004
- Reference no.: 105330

Macrossan Stores Depot Group is a heritage-listed military installation at Flinders Highway, Macrossan (Dotswood), Charters Towers Region, Queensland, Australia. It was added to the Australian Commonwealth Heritage List on 22 June 2004.

== History ==
The fear of a Japanese invasion of Australia after 1942 brought about a frantically redoubled building effort around Australia to accommodate the increased requirements of Allied troops, equipment and support networks. This was a period when conventional design and construction methods were abandoned in favour of those that were more resource and cost efficient. It was also a time of experimentation and innovation with timber, the most readily available construction material.

From 1915 to 1941 steel was the dominant material of choice for large buildings in Australia. With the start of conflict in Europe in 1939 Australia began to expand its military infrastructure in preparation for its role in the war. Training camps were expanded and established, with new buildings generally taking the form of the "P" series huts, open, gabled-roof timber buildings used for barracks, which could be adapted for practically any small-scale use. Until 1941, however, steel was still used for larger buildings.

After the Japanese attack on Pearl Harbor, with a Japanese invasion of Australia looming, a massive increase of Australian and other Allied troops (mostly American) and equipment occurred, prompting the need for further infrastructure. Building needs during this period were met by a merger of the Allied Works Council (AWC) and the Works and Services Branch of the Department of the Interior which, by 1943, employed over 4,500 staff. Each state also had its own works units, responsible for implementing the designs and orders of the AWC. These works initially used contract labour but, after 1943 relied on the labour of the Civil Construction Corps, which had enrolled over 50,000 men.

The importance of steel to the war effort meant that traditional building practices had to be abandoned. As a consequence the AWC turned to timber to fulfil its needs. Given the urgency of the situation, there was insufficient time for hardwoods to be seasoned. Therefore, new construction techniques were required that could utilise green timber. The AWC subsequently experimented with design form and construction technology to come up with a series of new designs for hangars and large warehouses.

Initially, a number of 130 feet (40 m) clear span timber framed hangars were constructed at Tocumwal, New South Wales, and other locations shortly after. The gable trusses were built with shear connectors and steel plate joints. Shortly after, Australia's first large-scale glue laminated building was constructed, with AWC assistance, in Alexandria, New South Wales. While the glue laminating process proved too involved and intensive for the AWC's needs, the timber frames with shear connectors were adapted for several other styles of large buildings, including the W3 type seen at Macrossan.

The influence of the United States military was also very important in developing new timber designs. One undoubted influence was the use of nail-joint construction, which was ideally suited to the use of green hardwood. This was used for the design of later "igloo" store and hangar buildings, as well as prefabricated ordnance buildings and trussed beams. The shear trusses used at Tocumwal and other locations were subsequently abandoned in favour of the nail joint technology. For spans over 20 metres, nailed lattice and nailed truss arches were adopted.

By 1944 the threat of invasion had subsided, and construction efforts were maintained primarily in the north of the country, to support Australian and US forces pressing on with the war in the Pacific. The AWC placed great emphasis on the prefabrication of buildings in southern states to be used by troops in the north, as well as in the Pacific Islands and south-east Asia.

=== Macrossan stores depot ===
Macrossan Stores Depot (RAAF No 8 Stores Depot) was established in 1942, on land resumed from the Costello family's Fanning Downs Pastoral lease, originally selected by John Melton Black in 1861. It was initially established as an air base, in response to fears of Japanese invasion, and realisation that Japanese air capabilities placed Australia within range of air attack. Early in 1942 a number of airfields were established at strategic points near the Great Northern Railway, running west from Townsville. Two airstrips were cleared at Macrossan in April 1942, intended to take American fighter aircraft, although only the northern strip was fully developed.

When the war effort began to turn in favour of the allied forces, airfield construction moved further north, and the air base facilities at Macrossan were never completed, although two fighter squadrons, the 84 and 86 RAAF (Royal Australian Air Force), were stationed there for short periods. Macrossan's emphasis subsequently shifted to that of a major stores depot, being proclaimed RAAF No 8 Stores Depot in April 1943. Some salvage and medical units also utilised the base on a small scale.

The RAAF operated 10 stores depots during World War II: No 1 Sandridge (Victoria), No 2 Waterloo (New South Wales), No 3 Brisbane (Queensland), No 4 Merredin (Western Australia), No 6 Dubbo (New South Wales), No 7 Drayton (Queensland), No 8 Macrossan (Queensland), No 9 Daly Waters (Northern Territory) and No 10 Maylands (Western Australia). Most of these were ultimately only temporary and were disbanded within a decade of the end of the war, with the exception of Dubbo, Sandridge, Waterloo and Drayton.

To facilitate the shift to a stores depot two very large general-purpose storage buildings were built side by side to the north of the airstrips for the RAAF. Construction of Building 50, today known as Warehouse 11, and its neighbour, Building 51, commenced in 1943. A two-kilometre rail spur was built at the same time to run through the buildings from the main railway line. A number of prefabricated, steel framed Bellman hangars and storehouses were also erected close by. In 1944 the base featured the Bellman hangars, four 200-by-100-foot (61 by 30 m) igloo warehouses, the two 300-by-230-foot (91 by 70 m) RAAF ordnance igloo stores (buildings 50 and 51) and three smaller store buildings. Ancillary buildings included a guardhouse, aircrew quarters, a kitchen and mess facilities to the south.

A commitment to the site for post-war military use resulted in formal acquisition of the land by the Australian Government in 1949. The RAAF vacated the depot in 1956, having jointly occupied it with the Army from 1952 onwards. The Army, as sole occupant thereafter, held a large auction of surplus buildings and equipment in 1956. In February 1972, building 51 was destroyed by a deliberately-lit fire. The remaining W3 warehouse, and three Bellman Hangars, survive from the World War II period. The spur line into Warehouse 11 was used for the last time in the early 1980s.

Macrossan has acted as the Army's major northern bulk stores depot since 1956.

== Description ==
Macrossan Stores Depot Group is at located off the Flinders Highway, 2.5 km (1.6 mi) east-north-east of Macrossan. It consists of a large irregular area, including the still-serviceable northern wartime airstrip, the railway spur line, Warehouse 11, four smaller store buildings (including three Bellman hangars) and several houses. The remains of World War Two taxiways, earthworks and the sites of thirty to forty wartime buildings are also evident.

Warehouse 11 is a large "igloo" type stores building located within the Australian Army's Macrossan Stores Depot east of Charters Towers in North Queensland. Several examples of this design type, known as W3, were constructed in Australia in 1942 and 1943, all sharing the same characteristics; these included a parabolic arch shape, engineered timber framing, unlined internal walls, external envelope in galvanised iron sheeting and a timber or concrete floor. Warehouse 11 was erected as a standard RAAF ordnance store with a large segmented truss roof structure with five longitudinal rows of solid hardwood columns supporting transverse segmented Pratt trusses. Rows of columns were spaced at 15.7 metres. Trusses were fabricated with steel bolts and shear connectors of unseasoned local hardwoods. Other RAAF ordnance stores of this type were located at RAAF stores depots at Dubbo (New South Wales), Drayton (Queensland) and Merredin (Western Australia). Apart from Warehouse 11 at Macrossan, only the five W3 structures that were constructed at the former Dubbo RAAF No 5 Stores Depot have survived. The Dubbo buildings have maintained a strong context in relation to each other and the other surviving buildings at this site. However, Macrossan has the only surviving example of this type in Queensland.

Warehouse 11 measures 94.5 by 73.5 metres (310 by 241 ft), with the longer sides forming the springing point for the igloo style vaulted timber truss structure, which is clad in corrugated galvanised iron. The two shorter semi-circular sides are some 18 metres in height, timber framed and also clad with corrugated galvanised iron. Three large doorways on each long side provide motor vehicle access. Exterior asphalt aprons cater for the latter function with railway lines still in place internally at the rear of the building. Concrete drains run along each of the long sides of the building. Natural lighting is provided by means of a clerestory as well as four rows of glass skylights. Near ground level small timber shutters run the full length of the long sides to provide light and ventilation. Large timber framed windows provide a similar function on the shorter sides.

The concrete floor of the warehouse was poured and laid in a matrix of uniform 3.90 by 3.05 metre sections. Timber posted uprights, set in five rows, sixteen metres apart, support the hand sawn timber roof trusses. The outside rows of posts are single-posted, the two inner rows are double-posted while the centre row is composed of three posts bracketed together. All of these uprights are rough, axe-hewn from solid trunks. According to local knowledge rainforest timbers from Mount Spec were used for this purpose. The building is unlined internally. Two small offices are located within the building's internal spaces.

Bellman hangars were a standard model intended for aircraft maintenance, developed to a British design using a steel frame. With the need to use timber instead of steel, a prefabricated timber framed version was developed by the Division of Forest Products at the Council for Scientific and Industrial Research (CSIR). The Bellman Hangars at Macrossan are of this same type, comparable to the example at Jezzine Barracks in Townsville, and probably those at the former RAAF No 6 Stores Depot at Dubbo, which are 33.5 by 33.5 metres (110 by 110 ft). While Bellman hangars were once common at RAAF facilities around Australia, they are now increasingly rare, having been removed, destroyed, or sold out of Commonwealth hands. There are perhaps no more than 25 examples remaining around Australia in Commonwealth hands, including those at Macrossan, Dubbo, Jezzine, RAAF Base Townsville, RAAF Base Amberley, RAAF Base Laverton, RAAF Base Point Cook and RAAF Base Tindal.

=== Condition ===
The site has been subject to ongoing use and maintenance by the Australian Army and the RAAF since 1942. Warehouse 11 and the three Bellman hangars are in good and close to original condition.

=== Integrity ===
Evidence of the original northern airstrip is still highly visible. There is also evidence of taxiways and embankments. However, most of the ancillary and minor storage buildings from the World War Two period have been removed.

Warehouse 11 appears to be ultimately in its original state, apart from small scale modifications and maintenance. Timber shutters in the two administrative areas have been replaced with glass louvres, some corrugated iron has been replaced with green fibreglassed corrugated material to allow for more light to enter the building, and fixed timber louvres have been replaced with aluminium louvres below the windows along the short sides.

On the north side the two detached latrines have been removed and replaced with a single modular building.

== Heritage listing ==
Macrossan Stores Depot Group was listed on the Australian Commonwealth Heritage List on 22 June 2004 having satisfied the following criteria.

Criterion A: Processes

The Macrossan Stores Depot (former RAAF No 8 Stores Depot) is significant for its role in the development of defensive infrastructure across Australia following Japan's entry into World War 2 in 1942. It comprises four surviving buildings from its wartime service, a large "W3" type igloo warehouse, and three prefabricated Bellman type hangars. It also comprises archaeological evidence of the World War 2 air base, with a still-serviceable landing strip, and remnants of the taxiways, embankments and building foundations. The site was established as a base for fighter squadrons in 1942, during initial fears of Japanese invasion and air attack over northern Queensland. After the initial danger had subsided the site was established as RAAF No 8 Stores Depot, continuing to make a contribution to the RAAF's operations, as well as acting as the occasional base for the 84 and 86 RAAF fighter squadrons. After 1956 the depot was transferred to the Army and has operated as its main supplies depot in northern Queensland ever since.

Warehouse 11 and the three Bellman hangars at the Macrossan Stores Depot, are important for their association with the development of defensive infrastructure across Australia following Japan's entry into the Second World War and the arrival of American forces in Australia in 1942.

Criterion B: Rarity

Warehouse 11 is important as the only surviving example of the "W3" type RAAF warehouse in Queensland, and one of only six intact surviving examples of the twelve built in Australia, the other five being located in Dubbo, NSW. The Bellman hangars are also of a type that is becoming increasingly rare. Although these prefabricated hangars were common buildings during World War Two there are now believed to be no more than two dozen of these surviving in Defence ownership in Australia today.

Criterion D: Characteristic values

Warehouse 11, in particular, is significant for its ability to demonstrate the innovative experimental technology explored by Allied Works Council and the Department of the Interior in an effort to produce large buildings using unseasoned hardwood instead of steel framing. Such experimentation was rendered necessary due to the stress placed on steel resources by the war effort. Warehouse 11 is of the "W3" type, of which only twelve were ever constructed and only six survive today.

The Bellman prefabricated hangars were common buildings during World War Two.

Criterion F: Technical achievement

Warehouse 11 is a massive "igloo" warehouse, with galvanised iron cladding supported by engineered timber framing and trusses fabricated with steel bolts and shear connectors of unseasoned local hardwoods.
