= Thomas Burdekin =

Australian merchant and politician (1801–1844)

Thomas Burdekin (22 November 1801 - 18 August 1844), ironmonger, was one of Australia's early merchants, industrialists, politicians and financiers. He was the father of Sydney Burdekin and Marshall Burdekin.

He resided opposite Parliament House on Macquarie Street, Sydney and came to hold influence in the new colony's politics and society. He grew very wealthy acquiring land through money-lending.

== Early life ==
Thomas was born in Sheffield, England on 28 December 1801 to Joseph and Elizabeth Burdekin. He arrived in Sydney on 7 July 1828 aboard the Australia to establish a branch of his father's ironmongers, Burdekin and Hawley, Ironmongers and General Merchants, in George Street, Sydney. He was a Bounty Immigrant, meaning the government paid for his passage due to his highly sought-after skills.

He employed a young Henry Parkes in late 1839 or early 1840, shortly after Parkes's arrival in the colony.

In 1831, he was elected to the Council of the Australian College, a short-lived college established by John Dunmore Lang. He is listed on a passenger ship as a merchant returning from a trip to Launceston, Tasmania in that year.

He and Mary Ann Bossley (1806-1889) obtained their marriage licence from St James Church on 31 December 1832 and were married at St Phillips on 5 January 1833. They were said to have been engaged prior to leaving England. Their five children were Lloyd (1834-1860), Bossley (1835-1882), Marshall (1837-1886), Sydney (1839-1899) and Mary Ann (1842-1845).

== Money lending and property ==
Burdekin began his land acquisition in 1830 with the purchase of a William Street lot from John Brown. By 1842, he owned property in Macquarie, College and York streets as well as vast tracts of land further afield beyond the Nineteen Counties in the Hunter and New England regions.

Through his financing and money-lending, Burdekin was able to acquire large amounts of real estate in rural New South Wales. By lending money in return for security on property, he took ownership of many properties after owners defaulted their debts. He was considered by many to be aggressive in his usury practices.

In 1838, Burdekin took legal action against a Thomas Underwood and others in the Supreme Court of New South Wales to recover debts. In 1841, he was granted 10 perches of land by the Colonial Secretary. In 1843, he was again in the Supreme Court taking action against another group.

=== Singleton case ===
In 1842, Burdekin foreclosed on Benjamin Singleton for £2,100 gaining control of most of the land in the township of Singleton, New South Wales. The case dragged on for many years and was managed by Burdekin's widow, Mary Ann and her brother, John Brown Bossley after Burdekin's death. This kind of aggressive moneylending and foreclosure made him deeply unpopular among borrowers and landowners.

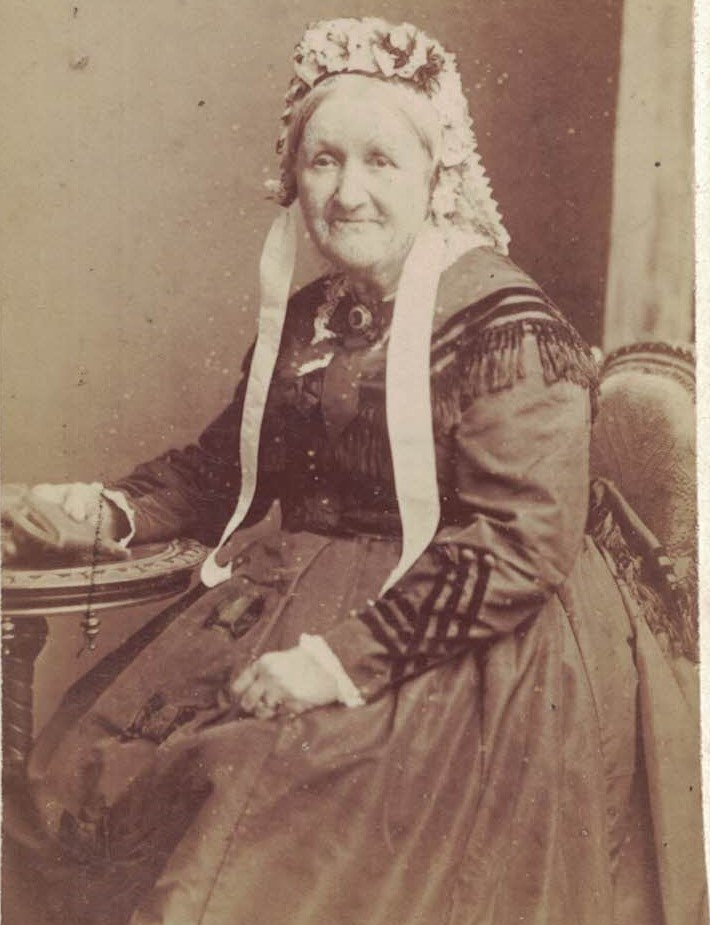
Mary Burdekin nee Bossley

== Burdekin House ==
In 1841, Thomas commissioned James Hume to design and build Burdekin House on Macquarie Street, considered the finest home in Sydney at the time. The mansion cost £17,000 and for many years was known as "Burdekin's Folly". The Burdekins lived there until the 1920s, when they moved to their larger estate at Rooty Hill.

It was demolished in the 1930s, a move which was controversial even then and which became the source of National Trust focus for future building preservation. St Stephen's Presbyterian Church now stands on that site.

== Political career ==
Thomas Burdekin was a Councillor for Cook Ward from 3 October 1843 to 9 February 1844.

== Ludwig Leichhardt ==
In 1844, Burdekin agreed to support German explorer Ludwig Leichhardt’s explorations into outback Queensland. After Thomas's death in 1844, his wife Mary Ann continued to contribute towards the costs of Leichhardt's explorations, leading to his discovery of the major river he named the Burdekin River in honour of Thomas and Mary. This in turn led to a whole area in Queensland known as Burdekin Shire.

== Death ==
Thomas Burdekin died on 18 August 1844, aged 42. He was buried at the old Church of England Cemetery at Rookwood. He left a large amount of real estate in Sydney and other parts of the colony to his family.

Wife Mary Ann Bossley became the matriarch of the Burdekin family, and managed much of the business affairs with her brother, John Bossley (1820-1872). She left an inheritance of £366,493 when she died. The suburb of Bossley Park in Sydney is named after her brother, John.

== In popular culture ==
Patrick White's novel Voss is based on the expeditions of German explorer Ludwig Leichhardt. In the novel, Johann Ulrich Voss is sponsored by wealthy Sydney merchant and draper, Edmund Bonner, a character based on Burdekin. White depicts Bonner as a successful but somewhat coarse, materialistic colonial businessman.
