= Burdekin River Pumping Station =

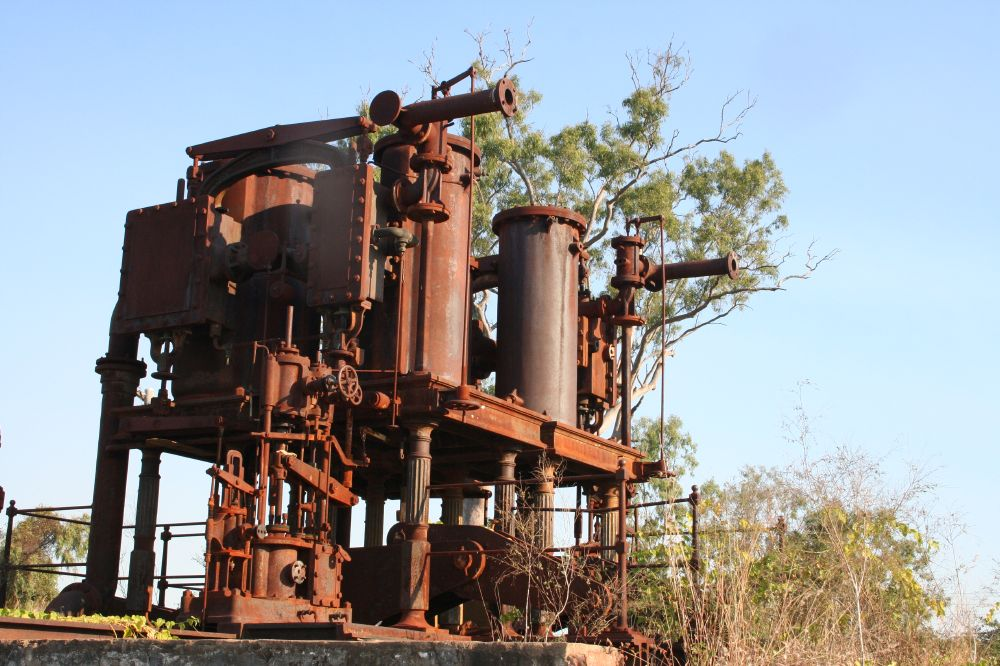
- Burdekin River Pumping Station, 2009

- Location within Queensland Location within Australia
- 19.98°S 146.3097°E
- Location: Weir Road, Breddan, Charters Towers Region, Queensland, Australia

History
- Design period: 1870s–1890s (late 19th century)
- Built: c. 1887–1910s

Queensland Heritage Register
- Official name: Burdekin River Pumping Station (former), Charters Towers Water Supply Scheme
- Type: state heritage (built, archaeological)
- Designated: 3 July 1995
- Reference no.: 601081
- Significant period: 1880s–1910s; 1942 (fabric); 1880s–1960s (historical)
- Significant components: engine/generator shed/room / power supply, tunnel – water, chimney/chimney stack, machinery/plant/equipment - utilities – water supply, tramway

Burdekin River Pumping Station is a heritage-listed pumping station at Weir Road, Breddan, Charters Towers Region, Queensland, Australia. It was built from c. 1887 to 1910s. It is also known as Charters Towers Water Supply Scheme. It was added to the Queensland Heritage Register on 3 July 1995.

== History ==
The former Burdekin River Pumping Station was erected as part of the important Charters Towers water supply system, constructed from 1887 to 1891 for the Burdekin Water Scheme Joint Board. When completed the scheme included a pumping station, rising main, reservoir on Tower Hill, chimney stack, engineer's residence, workers' cottages, provisional school, tram track, bridge across the Burdekin River and several trestle bridges to carry the rising main across small creeks between the pumping station and the reservoir in the town. The project cost around £80,000, exclusive of ongoing maintenance, the building of a weir in 1902 and construction of an aerial tramway (flying fox) across the river c. 1911.

The significance of the Charters Towers water supply system to the development of the surrounding goldfields cannot be overestimated. Discovered in late 1871, Charters Towers was the richest of the North Queensland mining fields, and made a major contribution to the social, political and commercial development of North Queensland in the late 19th and early 20th centuries. Peak production was reached in the early 1900s but by 1929 gold mining at Charter Towers had almost ceased.

Early Charters Towers mining activity depended on the local creeks, but the demand for water grew as population and mining expanded. Charters Towers was proclaimed a town in 1877, and by the early 1880s was a prosperous settlement with a rail link to the coast opened in 1882, yet still no sanitation system or reticulated water. In dry seasons the town survived on well water, and crushing slowed at the mines. A report and estimate for a water supply scheme for Charters Towers was prepared in 1878 by the Resident Engineer for Northern Waterworks, John Baillie Henderson, but action was delayed until the very dry years 1883–85 during which time a public campaign run by Thadeus O'Kane, editor of The Northern Miner, placed pressure on the government to provide an adequate water supply at Charters Towers. This campaign corresponded with a growing movement in industrialised countries for the establishment of water supply and sewerage infrastructures in urban communities.

In 1884 the Queensland Water Supply Department (established in 1881 with JB Henderson as the government Hydraulic Engineer) revived and modified the 1878 scheme. A new report was prepared but considered too expensive. Only following the 1886 speculative boom in Charters Towers did the government instruct Henderson to prepare a cheaper scheme. This was done by reducing the number of pumping stations from two to one and installing only one pumping engine initially. Water was to be pumped through a 12-inch (300 mm) cast-iron rising main to a circular reservoir on Tower Hill, from where it would be reticulated by gravity.

Under the Local Authority (Joint Action) Act 1886 the Burdekin Water Scheme Joint Board, drawn from members of Dalrymple Divisional Board and Charters Towers Municipal Council, was established to administer the project. Because the Board had no borrowing rights, loans of £30,200 each had to be raised through the Charters Towers Municipal Council and the Dalrymple Divisional Board, which were responsible for managing the loans.

In November 1886 a survey of the waterworks site was completed, with 7 acres (2.8 ha) reserved for the service reservoir at Tower Hill in Charters Towers, 53 acres (21 ha) reserved for the pipe track to town, and 742 acres (300 ha) at the junction of the Burdekin and Sheepstation Creek (13 kilometres (8.1 mi) northeast of Charters Towers) set aside as a water supply reserve (R.123) for the pumping station. The water supply reserve also functioned as a timber reserve to supply the wood to fuel the steam-driven pump engines, and was extended in the 1890s.

While the land survey and loans were being arranged Henderson prepared the plans and Frederick Talbot Joyce, a London trained civil engineer from Sydney, was selected as the site engineer. By early 1888 the Joint Board had placed an order with Hathorn Davey & Company of Leeds, England for a 75 horse power, inverted compound non-rotative engine coupled to a two-stage pumping system, with a capacity of 20,000 imperial gallons per hour (91 m^{3}/h). The engine was designed by Henry Davey who made a significant contribution to the development of steam powered water pumping systems during the late 19th century. His differential system, applied to vertical compound engines, greatly increased the efficiency of non-rotative pumping engines and prolonged their viability as alternatives to rotating machines. Plans for the engine foundations, specifications for the assembling of engine and boilers, directions for the construction of buildings to protect them, and plans for a 60-foot (18 m) high chimney arrived from Hathorn Davey in June 1888.

Despite initial progress, the project was plagued with problems and delays due to inexperience in implementing such a large project, a shortage of skilled labour, personality clashes and professional conflict between Henderson and Joyce. In mid-1888 the project ground to a halt and the Joint Board considered removing the project from the hands of the government engineers, but the loan structure prohibited this. It took intervention by the colonial secretary, Sir Thomas McIlwraith, for Henderson to abandon opposition to Joyce's plans and in June the Queensland Government approved issue of a loan so that the work could proceed.

Thomas H Mann & Co. was appointed contractor for the civil works at the pumping station, and in September 1888 F Taylor was appointed Foreman of Works and construction of the reservoir on Tower Hill commenced. Talbot Joyce prepared plans and specifications for the Charters Towers water reticulation scheme - 300,000 imperial gallons (1,400,000 L; 360,000 US gal) pumped through 20 miles (32 km) of pipe to service 5,000 people, with the possibility of supplying 600,000 imperial gallons (2,700,000 L; 720,000 US gal) after the installation of a second engine. Thomas Tolson was granted the contract to dig the pipe trenches and build the trestle bridges across the small creeks between the pumping station at Sheepstation Creek and the town. In October 1888 Thomas Mann called tenders for making 80,000 bricks at the pumping station site, and in November the Joint Board accepted the tender of Contes and Company of London to supply pipes to the value of £22,700.

During January 1889 substantial progress was made with the civil works at the pumping station. An inlet tunnel 172 feet (52 m) long to the river had been completed and was being lined with concrete and the pump shaft had been sunk to its full depth. The frame for the machinery shed at the pumping station had been constructed by Benjamin Toll, the boilers had arrived from England, and the site for the reservoir on Tower Hill had been excavated.

In 1889 conflict arose between the Dalrymple Divisional Board and the municipalities of Charters Towers, Millchester and Queenton, which were preparing to merge as one local authority, with the Divisional Board claiming that its ratepayers would have to pay higher water rates than those in the greater Charters Towers area. Disagreements over aspects of the waterworks project were common during Joint Board meetings and a violent disagreement over chairmanship of the Board in 1889 was resolved in the Supreme Court. By late February the civil works at the pumping station were nearing completion. A major difficulty arose in April 1889 when it was discovered that Hathorn Davey had sent coal-burning Lancashire boilers when specially designed wood-burning boilers had been ordered. Hathorn Davey thought it understood that Lancashire boilers were more suitable for the site because they had two flues which allowed for the burning of either coal or timber, but offered to pay for the construction of furnaces. This offer was accepted and the furnaces, built of brick by Thomas H Mann & Co, cost £180 to install.

By August 1889 the chimney was under construction and work was progressing well, when Talbot Joyce tendered his resignation following a dispute with Taylor and the contractor for the reservoir. Joyce's resignation was accepted (illegally) by the Joint Board, Taylor was sacked and a new foreman (engineer William Bolland) appointed. By October the completion of works was slowing down and Talbot Joyce was reinstated, to resign of his own accord in March 1890. William Bolland took over as site engineer, and remained Resident Engineer of the Charters Towers water supply system until well into the 20th century.

An engineer employed by Hathorn Davey was sent from London to install the pump engine in 1889–90, and a tool shed and fence round the engine site were erected. The pump commenced operation in early February 1891, although not to full capacity. By August 1891 the reticulation system was operating fully, and by December 1,036 dwellings had been connected. After some delay the colonial government approved a £3,000 loan extension for the reticulation scheme and by 1894 3,132 premises were connected.

Flooding in 1894 caused problems at the pumping station when dirty water threatened to damage the pump and the intake tunnel silted up. To overcome this problem two shafts were sunk into the river bed to a depth of 42 feet (13 m) so that sand-filtered water could be procured.

During the very dry years 1895–96 the high demand for water created difficulties in keeping the pumping station working, and the decision was made to purchase a second Hathorn Davey pump engine. By late May 1896 a new engine of the same capacity 20,000 imperial gallons per hour (91 m^{3}/h) had been installed. The wood supply for these engines was exhausted on the western bank, so a low level bridge across the river was erected and a tram track laid for a distance of 1? miles to tap the supply of wood on the eastern side of the Burdekin.

In January 1898 Pumping Station Provisional (later State) School opened on land excised from the Water Supply Reserve (R.123), and served the families of the resident station workers and local farmers until closed in 1936.

The 1890s had been exceptionally dry and by 1900 Queensland was experiencing the worst drought on record. The drought corresponded with a large increase in population in Charters Towers and a subsequent increase in demand for water. There were 20,000 people in the district by 1897 and the population reached a peak of 26,780 in 1900. The reticulation scheme, extended in 1894, was not able to cope with the enormous increase in demand. The introduction of water restrictions changed the face of the town which, with the introduction of water reticulation in 1891, had become noted for its beautiful gardens and cool streets.

In 1902 the Board erected a substantial weir on R.122 upstream from the pumping station. The designer and site engineer was William Bolland, and construction was completed in November 1902. At 900 feet (270 m) in length, 16 feet (4.9 m) maximum depth and capacity of 400,000,000 imperial gallons (1.8×10^{9} L; 480,000,000 US gal), the new weir was exceptional in scale and design for its time, and proved to be a tourist attraction and recreational venue for Charters Towers.

In the 1910s development at the pumping station included an aerial tramway (flying fox) constructed to replace the bridge across the Burdekin which was swept away in 1910/11; relocation in the creek bed of the rising main across Sheepstation Creek in 1913, eliminating on- going maintenance of the repeatedly flood-damaged trestle bridge; and in 1915–16 replacement of the Lancashire boilers with Cornish boilers purchased from the Brilliant and St George Mill and the Brilliant Central Mine. These were functioning by February 1916.

As the pump engines aged and the demand for a substantial supply of water continued, the provision of another pumping plant was discussed and a site selected up stream from the weir. However, before these plans were implemented the pressing need for water eased. By 1924 gold production at Charters Towers was on the decline, the population was falling, the demand for water had decreased and the pumps were able to meet the needs of the town. They continued in operation until 1942 when electric pumps were installed in a new shed behind the old pumps. These electric pumps remained in operation until 1975.

The 1942 installation of electric pumps was necessary because of the vast increase in population in Charters Towers and district during the lead up to the war in the Pacific. By February 1942 a Japanese invasion of Australia seemed imminent. To meet the danger, five US air bases with up to 15,000 personnel were located in the Charters Towers district. The Royal Australian Air Force and the Australian Army also had bases in the area.

After the war No 2 Hathorn Davey pump engine was used occasionally but No 1 was not used again. No 2 pump was decommissioned in 1954 and it is understood that in the 1960s the boilers were removed and sold for scrap and the engines partially dismantled. In August 1975 a new electric pumping station was built at the weir.

== Description ==
The former Burdekin River Pumping Station is located to the northeast of Charters Towers on the western bank of the Burdekin River. It is about one kilometre south of the present city weir and pumping station, on a peninsula at the junction of the Burdekin River and Sheepstation Creek. The pumping station, engineer's residence, worker's cottages and school were located on the north bank of the creek, which crosses the Water Supply Reserve from east to west. The school, cottages and engineer's residence are no longer extant.

The immediate site of the pump station has been fenced with a two metres high cyclone wire fence and the enclosed area has been well maintained. The ground between the creek and the bank of the river, which contains most of the remnants of the water supply system, has been kept clear of trees and larger shrubs. Some regrowth has occurred outside of this area and the creek is overgrown with vegetation. Scatters of machinery parts and building materials can be found along the banks and in the dry stream bed. Remnant pieces of machinery can be found scattered around the area close to the engines although some of these pieces have been gathered and stored to protect them from theft.

The western bank of the Burdekin River below the pumping station has become badly eroded. This erosion stems from the late 1880s when an inlet tunnel was constructed and flooding on several occasions washed away the disturbed river bank. The erosion has recently become so severe that the foundations of the steam pumps are threatened. The inlet tunnel remains although the stone work on the river bank entrance has been covered by sand. The access within the foundations of the engines remains intact.

Remnants of the aerial tramway (flying fox) foundations are located outside the fenced enclosure around the engines. Part of the tram track is visible in front of the flying fox foundations. The tracks run north-south along the river bank and finish near the engines. The chimney stands slightly northwest of the engines.

The steam engines and their foundations are relatively intact. After one hundred years the concrete steps and brickwork are deteriorating but have not yet reached a point where the security of the engines is threatened. The engines themselves are in reasonable condition, although some dismantling took place in the 1960s.

Behind the old engines is a fibrous cement clad building which was constructed to house the 1942 electric pumps. This building is in good condition and the electric pumps have been well maintained. To the south of the 1942 electric engine shed remnants of the rising main survive on the banks of Sheepstation Creek.

== Heritage listing ==
The former Burdekin River Pumping Station was listed on the Queensland Heritage Register on 3 July 1995 having satisfied the following criteria.

The place is important in demonstrating the evolution or pattern of Queensland's history.

The former Burdekin River Pumping Station demonstrates the substantial contribution of the late 19th century Charters Towers water supply system to the establishment of the surrounding gold fields at a critical period in the economic development of Queensland.

The place demonstrates rare, uncommon or endangered aspects of Queensland's cultural heritage.

The pumping engines are rare as they appear to be the only examples of Hathorn Davey inverted cross-compound non-rotative pumping engines surviving in the world, and are amongst the most important stationary steam engines remaining in Australia.

The place has potential to yield information that will contribute to an understanding of Queensland's history.

The site also has potential to reveal further information about late 19th century waterworks technology, layout, construction and materials.

The place is important in demonstrating the principal characteristics of a particular class of cultural places.

The pumping station remains an important illustration of late 19th century waterworks technology employed at a time when local authorities in Queensland were becoming aware of the benefits of a clean, plentiful water supply to their communities. The pumping head from the Burdekin River to the service reservoir in Charters Towers of 570 feet (170 m) was the highest employed in Queensland up to that time.

The place is important in demonstrating a high degree of creative or technical achievement at a particular period.

They are fitted with Davey's patented differential valve gear and are valuable examples of late 19th century British technology imported to Australia, and particularly of the work of Henry Davey (1843–1928). Davey was one of the great British engineers of the late Victorian era, and had a profound impact on the development of steam water pumping technology at a time when local authorities were becoming aware of the significant benefits of a clean water supply to the health of their communities.

The place has a special association with the life or work of a particular person, group or organisation of importance in Queensland's history.

The former Burdekin River Pumping Station has a close association with the work of engineers JB Henderson and FT Joyce and their contributions to the development of Queensland in the late 19th and early 20th centuries.

== Engineering heritage ==
The water supply system received an Engineering Heritage Marker from Engineers Australia as part of its Engineering Heritage Recognition Program.
