= St Stephen's Uniting Church =

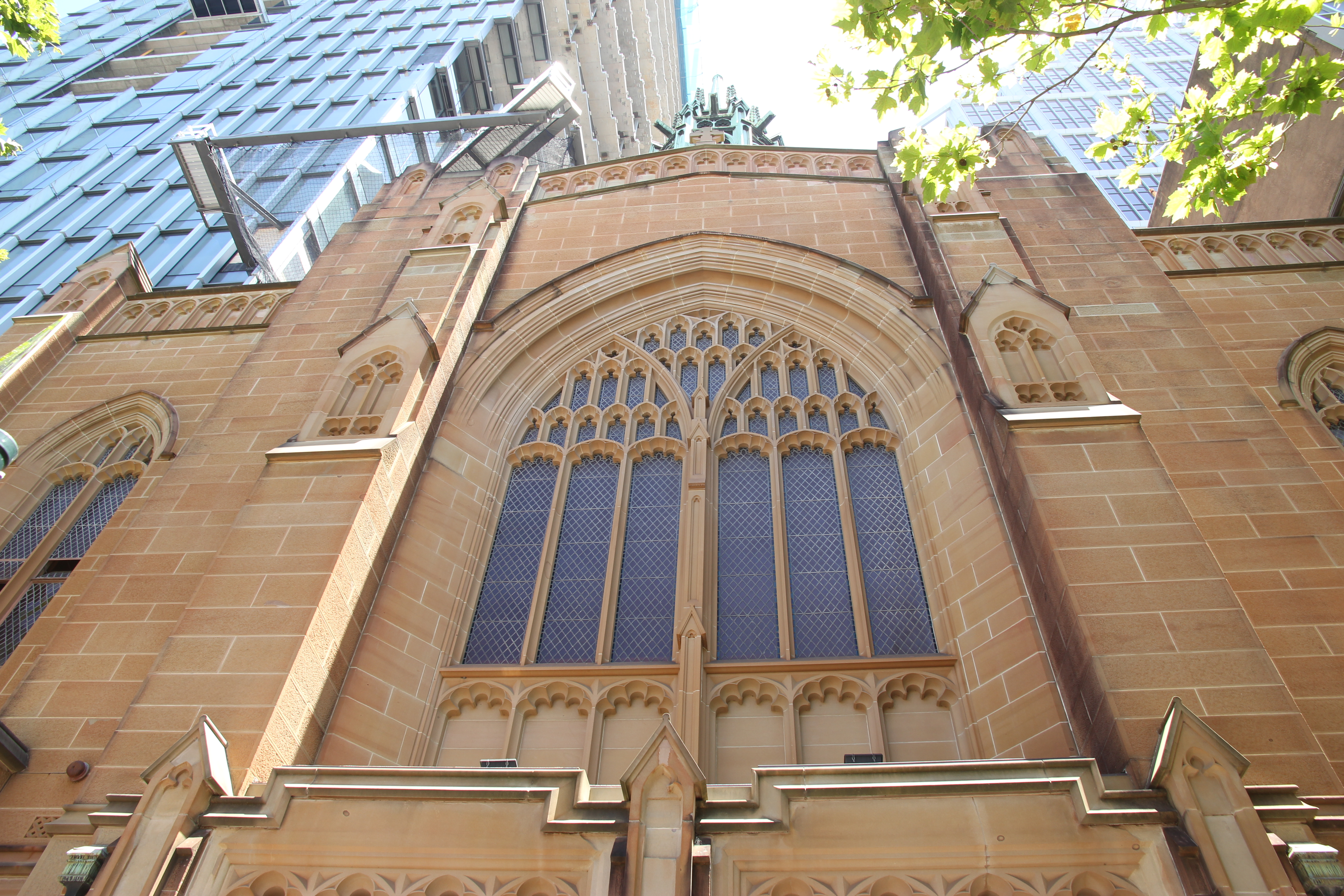
- The sandstone facade of St Stephen's, pictured in 2019

- Location in the Sydney central business district
- 33.8673°S 151.2120°E
- Location: 197 Macquarie Street, Sydney central business district, City of Sydney, New South Wales, Australia
- Country: Australia
- Denomination: Uniting (since 1977)
- Previous denomination: Presbyterian (1935 – 1977)
- Website: www.ssms.org.au

History
- Former name: St Stephen's Presbyterian Church
- Status: Parish church

Architecture
- Functional status: Active
- Architect(s): Finlay Munro Jnr and John Reid
- Architectural type: Interwar Gothic
- Years built: 1935–1937

New South Wales Heritage Register
- Official name: St. Stephen's Uniting Church; St Stephen's Presbyterian Church
- Type: State heritage (built)
- Designated: 3 September 2004
- Reference no.: 1704
- Type: Church
- Category: Religion
- Builders: Kell & Rigby

St Stephen's Uniting Church is a congregation of the Uniting Church located at 197 Macquarie Street, in the Sydney central business district, in the City of Sydney local government area of New South Wales, Australia. It is part of the Sydney Presbytery and the NSW-ACT Synod.

Founded initially as St Stephen's Presbyterian Church, the building was designed by Finlay Munro Jnr and John Reid and built from 1935 to 1937 by Kell & Rigby. It was added to the New South Wales State Heritage Register on 3 September 2004.

The current minister is Reverend Ken Day.

== History ==
The present St Stephen's Church is the second church of that name in Macquarie Street, the fourth in the precinct. The congregation were originally housed in St Stephen's Church in Phillip Street, and later in the Iron Church in Macquarie Street. The second St Stephen's was located south of the present church in Macquarie Street.

The name of the church was selected because its geographical location and links to Parliament of New South Wales were seen to reflect those of St Stephen's of Westminster with the British Houses of Parliament.

== Building description ==
St Stephen's Church is designed in the Inter War Gothic style and occupies a prime location in Macquarie Street, opposite State Parliament. The masonry building includes a rectangular church and gallery, hall, offices and ancillary spaces. The main elevation is sandstone with carved tracery and leadlight windows and is symmetrical about the eastern window. Stairs located at the north and south sides of the entrance vestibule provide access to the gallery and Ferguson Hall below. The interiors feature extensive polished timber panelling and plaster ceilings that draw inspiration from traditional English Perpendicular Gothic.

== Heritage listing ==
St Stephen's Uniting Church was listed on the New South Wales State Heritage Register on 3 September 2004. It is part of a group of high quality and historic buildings lining Macquarie Street and contributing to that historic precinct.

St Stephen's Uniting Church is historically and socially significant as the focus of the congregation of St Stephen's, formed in 1842 and is associated with a number of prominent members of Sydney, including Churchmen, Statesmen and Military. Its history is interwoven with the development of the Presbyterian and Uniting Churches in NSW and Australia, in which it has played a prominent role. St Stephen's has been continuously located within the Macquarie Street precinct for over 150 years. The church has aesthetic significance as an example of the Inter War Gothic style of architecture, and as one of three extant churches in that style in central Sydney.

St Stephen's Uniting Church sits on the former site of Burdekin House, one of Sydney's Colonial social landmarks for over 90 years. Burdekin House was built in 1841-1842 by Thomas Burdekin, and remained in family ownership until sold in 1924.

St Stephen's congregation was formed in 1842. Since the 1840s St Stephen's has been a part of the spiritual life of the people of Sydney. It continues to make an important contribution to the development of religious thought and observance in New South Wales.

St Stephen's Uniting Church has strong associations with the life and work of:

- successive Presbyterian Ministers who provided leadership both to St Stephen's and within the presbyterian and Uniting Churches as they developed, including Rev. Dr Steel, Rev John Ferguson, Rev. James McLeod and Rev. Gordon Powell.
- Statesmen, including NSW State Governors Sir John Northcott, Sir Eric Woodward (Both were honoured with State Funerals at St Stephen's), James Cameron Speaker of the NSW Legislative Assembly, Sir Leslie Herron, NSW Chief Justice.
- The individuals and families commemorated in its memorials.
- Notable individuals including Rev Dr J. Fred McKay, successor to Rev. John Flynn of the inland, associate Minister St Stephen's 1974 to 1986, Messrs Bob Joss and Robert White, Managing Directors of Westpac.
- Architects, John Reid and Finlay Munro Junior.

St Stephen's history is interwoven with the development of the Presbyterian and Uniting Churches in NSW and Australia, in which it played a leading role.

== Music ==
St Stephen's Church Choir sings at Sunday services, Good Friday, Easter and Christmas.

Classical music concerts are held in the church each Friday.

Since 2018 jazz music has been a regular part of the church's musical life. Jazz Behind the Green Door is a monthly jazz music event focusing on performances by emerging jazz musicians. Jazz Vespers are held fortnightly. The 2023 Sydney International Women's Jazz Festival was held at St Stephen's.

St Stephen's is a popular performance venue, with Australian musicians including Paul Kelly and Marcia Hines performing concerts in the church.

The five-hundred voice Handel's Messiah choir uses St Stephen's as its rehearsal venue.

The current Music Director is Mark Quarmby and the current Choral Director is Dr Huw Belling.

== Pipe organ ==
The Organ in St Stephen's Uniting Church was built in 1934 by the Australian branch of the English firm Hill, Norman & Beard in Melbourne. It now has 61 stops and approximately 2,500 pipes. During the 1970s, a number of changes were made to the organ, based on the neo-Baroque style prevalent during that time. Some of these changes have been reversed during restoration work commenced in 2009 while romantic pipework which was removed at that time is gradually being replaced.

A new console, built by Daniel Bittner from Australian Pipe Organs in Melbourne, was installed in 2021.

== Carillon ==
An A.W.A. electronic tubular bell carillon was installed in the 1960's, and is one of the few still working in Australia today.

== Scholarship Program ==
The St Stephen's Scholarship Programme awards scholarships to students studying music at the Sydney Conservatorium of Music. Grants for scholarships are provided by the St Stephen's Sydney Music and Cultural Foundation.

== Notable people ==
Notable past and present members of the congregation include:

- Peter Dodds McCormick (1833 – 1916) was an Australian schoolteacher and songwriter, known for composing the Australian national anthem, "Advance Australia Fair". McCormick was a stonemason on the Philip Street church as a young man, and later became the Choral Director of the St Stephen's choir.
- Reverend John Ferguson (1852 - 1925). In August 1894 Ferguson was inducted to St Stephen's, Phillip Street, Sydney, the largest Presbyterian congregation in Australia. He was moderator-general in 1909. Ferguson collapsed in the pulpit of St Stephen's in October 1924 and died at his house at Atherton.
- Norman St Clair Carter (1875-1963), portrait-painter and stained-glass artist, designed the stained glass windows in St Stephen's Uniting Church, the 'Warriors' Chapel' in All Saints Cathedral, Bathurst, and the Teachers' College, Armidale; other major works include the north clerestory windows in St Andrew's Cathedral, Sydney. He also enjoyed painting such murals as those in the philosophy lecture room, University of Sydney (1921), the Rural Bank of New South Wales, Martin Place, Sydney (1938), and the Maritime Services Board (1952). He was also a renowned portrait painter, and his portraits of prime ministers Sir Edmund Barton and W. M. Hughes are in Parliament House, Canberra.
- Lieutenant General Sir John Northcott KCMG, KCVO, CB, KStJ (1890 – 1966) was an Australian Army general who served as Chief of the General Staff during the Second World War, and commanded the British Commonwealth Occupation Force in the Occupation of Japan. He was the first Australian-born Governor of New South Wales.
- Lieutenant General Sir Eric Winslow Woodward KCMG, KCVO, CB, CBE, DSO, KStJ (1899 – 1967) was an Australian military officer and viceroy. Following long service in the Australian Army, including terms as Deputy Chief of the General Staff and General Officer Commanding Eastern Command, he was appointed as the Governor of New South Wales from 1957 to 1965, thus becoming the first New South Welshman to be governor of the state.
- Sir Leslie James Herron KBE, CMG, KStJ (1902 – 1973) was a prominent Australian barrister, judge, Chief Justice and Lieutenant-Governor of New South Wales. The ferry The Lady Herron was named after his wife.
- Reverend Dr Fred McKay AC, CMG, OBE, MA, BD, Hon LLD (1907 - 2000), the successor to the Reverend John Flynn after he died, was superintendent of the Australian Inland Mission and the Royal Flying Doctor Service.
- Gordon Powell AM KCSJ (1911-2005) was a Presbyterian minister, broadcaster and writer, and is regarded as one of the most influential Australian Presbyterians. He introduced Alcoholic Anonymous to Australia. At the age of 41 moved to Sydney as the Minister of St Stephen's where he regularly preached to more than a thousand listeners on Sundays and Wednesday lunchtimes. When Billy Graham came to Sydney in 1959 Powell was closely involved in the massive tour. In 1953 he began his thirty years' broadcasting on the Christian Broadcasting Association. In 1954 he and his wife were chosen to sit beside the Queen at lunch on her Australian visit, and in 1960, on a visit of his own to the USA, he delivered the opening prayer in the US Senate.
- Dame Joan Sutherland OM, AC, DBE (1926 – 2010) was an Australian dramatic coloratura soprano known for her contribution to the renaissance of the bel canto repertoire from the late 1950s to the 1980s. She was known as 'La Stupenda' and is widely regarded as one of the greatest sopranos of all time. Sutherland's parents were members of St Stephen's, her father being an elder of the church, and her mother being a member of the St Stephen's church choir. Sutherland sang in the choir from the age of 6.
- Marcia Hathaway (1930–1963) was an Australian actress who worked extensively in theatre and on Sydney radio. She died after being attacked by a Bull shark in shallow water at Sugarloaf Bay, Middle Harbour, Sydney, on January 28, 1963. Hathaway was a member of the St Stephen's congregation, and floodlighting for the church was donated by friends in her memory.

== List of Ministers ==
- Rev. Dr Robert Steel (Jun 1862 – Oct 1893)
- Rev. John Ferguson (Aug 1894 – Mar 1925)
- Rev. Hugh Paton (Sep 1925 – Apr 1933)
- Rev. James McLeod (Dec 1933 – Mar 1939)
- Rev. Alan Tory (Sep 1939 – Mar 1951)
- Rev. Gordon Powell (Feb 1952 – Nov 1965)
- Rev. Graham Hardy (May 1967 – Jan 1987)
- Rev. Scott McPheat (Apr 1988 – Apr 1999)
- Rev. Bruce Walker (May 1999 – Oct 2002)
- Rev. Dr Bill Ives (Dec 2002 – Dec 2004)
- Rev. Dr Matthew Jack (Feb 2004 – Jan 2010)
- Rev. Dr Ockhart Meyer (May 2011 – Mar 2014)
- Rev. Ken Day (Dec 2015 – present)

== List of Organists ==
- Richard Edward Philips (1880 – 1883)
- George W. Yarnton (1883 – 1890)
- Harry Chandler MA (1890 – 1940)
- Murray Fastier (1940)
- George Venn Barnett (1940 – 1946)
- Leonard Bell (1946 – 1953)
- W. Ken Charlton (1954 – 1965)
- James Forsyth Grant (1965 – 1972)
- (Mr) Val Robertson (1972)
- Dr Leonard Burtenshaw (1972 – 1981)
- Margaret Orchard (1982)
- Heather Moen-Boyd (1983 – 1987)
- Bruce Brown (1987 – 1991)
- Anthony Souter (1991 – 2000)
- Daniel Dries (2000 – 2006)
- Peter Guy (2006 – 2007)
- Adrian Chong (2007 – 2009)
- Mark Quarmby (2009 – present)

== List of Choral Directors ==
- Geoffrey Kendall (1982 – 1984)
- Peter Pocock (1985 – 1989)
- Tim Chung (2009 – 2010)
- Anthony Pasquill (2010 – 2013)
- Dr David Hood (2014 – 2016)
- Dr Huw Belling (2017 – present)

== See also ==
- Australian non-residential architectural styles
- List of Uniting churches in Sydney
