= Burdekin (surname) =

Burdekin is a surname. Notable people with the surname include:

- Beaufort Burdekin (1891–1963), British rower
- Katharine Burdekin (1896–1963), British novelist
- Marshall Burdekin (1837–1886), Australian politician
- Michael Burdekin (born 1938), British civil engineer
- Sydney Burdekin (1839–1899), Australian politician
