= Burdekin River Rail Bridge =

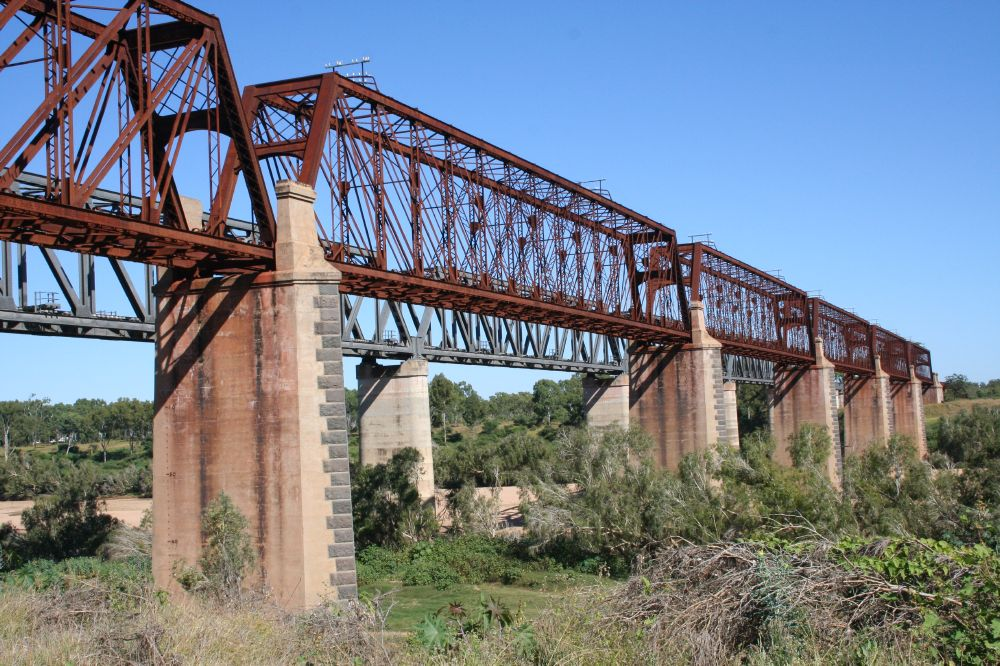
- Burdekin River Rail Bridge, 2009
- Coordinates: 20.0064°S 146.4373°E
- Carries: Great Northern railway
- Crosses: Burdekin River
- Locale: Dotswood, Charters Towers Region, Queensland, Australia
- Owner: Queensland Rail

History
- Architect: Henry Charles Stanley
- Construction start: c. 1896
- Construction end: 1899

History
- Design period: 1870s–1890s (late 19th century)

Queensland Heritage Register
- Official name: Burdekin River Rail Bridge (former), Macrossan Bridge
- Type: state heritage (built)
- Designated: 21 October 1992
- Reference no.: 600442
- Significant period: 1890s (fabric); 1899–1964 (historical use)
- Significant components: abutments – railway bridge, pier/s (bridge)
- Builders: Swanson Brothers

Location
- Interactive map of Burdekin River Rail Bridge

Burdekin River Rail Bridge is a heritage-listed former railway bridge on the Great Northern railway over the Burdekin River at Dotswood, Charters Towers Region, Queensland, Australia. It was designed by Henry Charles Stanley and built from c. 1896 to 1899 by Swanson Brothers. It is also known as Macrossan Bridge. It was added to the Queensland Heritage Register on 21 October 1992.

== History ==
The former Burdekin River Rail Bridge is a metal truss bridge running parallel to the current bridge and was designed to carry the Great Northern Railway over the Burdekin River at Macrossan in 1899.

The Great Northern Railway was intended principally to connect the important goldfield at Charters Towers to the port of Townsville, although it was also of great value to the pastoral industry and the general development of North Queensland. In August 1877 the Queensland Government approved the first stretch of line to the top of the Haughton Range. The line to Mingela (formerly Ravenswood Junction) was opened on 9 November 1881, to Macrossan on 24 July 1882 and to Charters Towers on 14 December 1882.

In order to cross the Burdekin River, the line was carried over a road bridge at Macrossan which had been opened for traffic in mid-1879 and was converted for railway use in 1881. A temporary line was laid on the upstream side to enable the passage of freight from November 1882 even before work was completed. However, this bridge was low level and was frequently under water during the wet season, disrupting traffic. On 22 March 1890 a major flood covered the bridge to a depth of 55 feet (17 m). It was clearly necessary to construct a higher bridge and a decision was made to do so, though not implemented for some years after this. The new bridge was designed while Henry Charles Stanley was Chief Engineer for Railways. Stanley was an important early engineer in Queensland. He was born and trained in Scotland and was appointed to Queensland Railways in 1863. After working as chief engineer on several lines, he became responsible for the whole colony in 1892. During the 1890s a number of large metal truss rail bridges were constructed and crossed major streams making the connection of important towns and resources possible. In this way they were vital to the operation of the transport system and the development of the state as a whole. Many of these early bridges have since been replaced.

A contract for the Macrossan bridge (at a projected cost of £52,143) and a 3-mile (4.8 km) deviation was let to Swanson Brothers on 26 May 1896. Although completion was planned for 1897, the bridge was not finished until 17 January 1899 and, after tests, it was passed for use by the Government Inspector for Bridges in March 1899. At the time of its construction, it was one of the largest bridges in Queensland and was the last of the series of its type built.

The completed bridge was 3 metres (9.8 ft) above the highest known flood level. Its six 250-foot (76 m) steel spans were supported on piers and basalt cutwater quoins based on rock. There were four 50-foot (15 m) continuous plate girders on each side and 434 feet (132 m) of timber trestle. The track was supported on the lower chord, the floor completely decked and a substantial handrail provided. However, despite its size, the bridge was limited to carrying an 8-ton axle load. It was thought that the problem lay not with the bridge itself but rather with the timber approaches. These were strengthened by 1937 and the bridge was then used by all classes of steam locomotives.

Although diesel locomotives used the bridge from 1953, the bridge could not be economically strengthened to take two coupled diesel locomotives. In 1961 work began on a new bridge upstream. This new bridge was opened on 16 May 1964. It was similar in construction to the old bridge and because it is located close to the alignment of the old bridge it was not economically feasible to remove the old bridge without risk of damage to the new. The old bridge was decommissioned and the timber approach spans totalling 434 feet (132 m) on the eastern side have been removed.

== Description ==
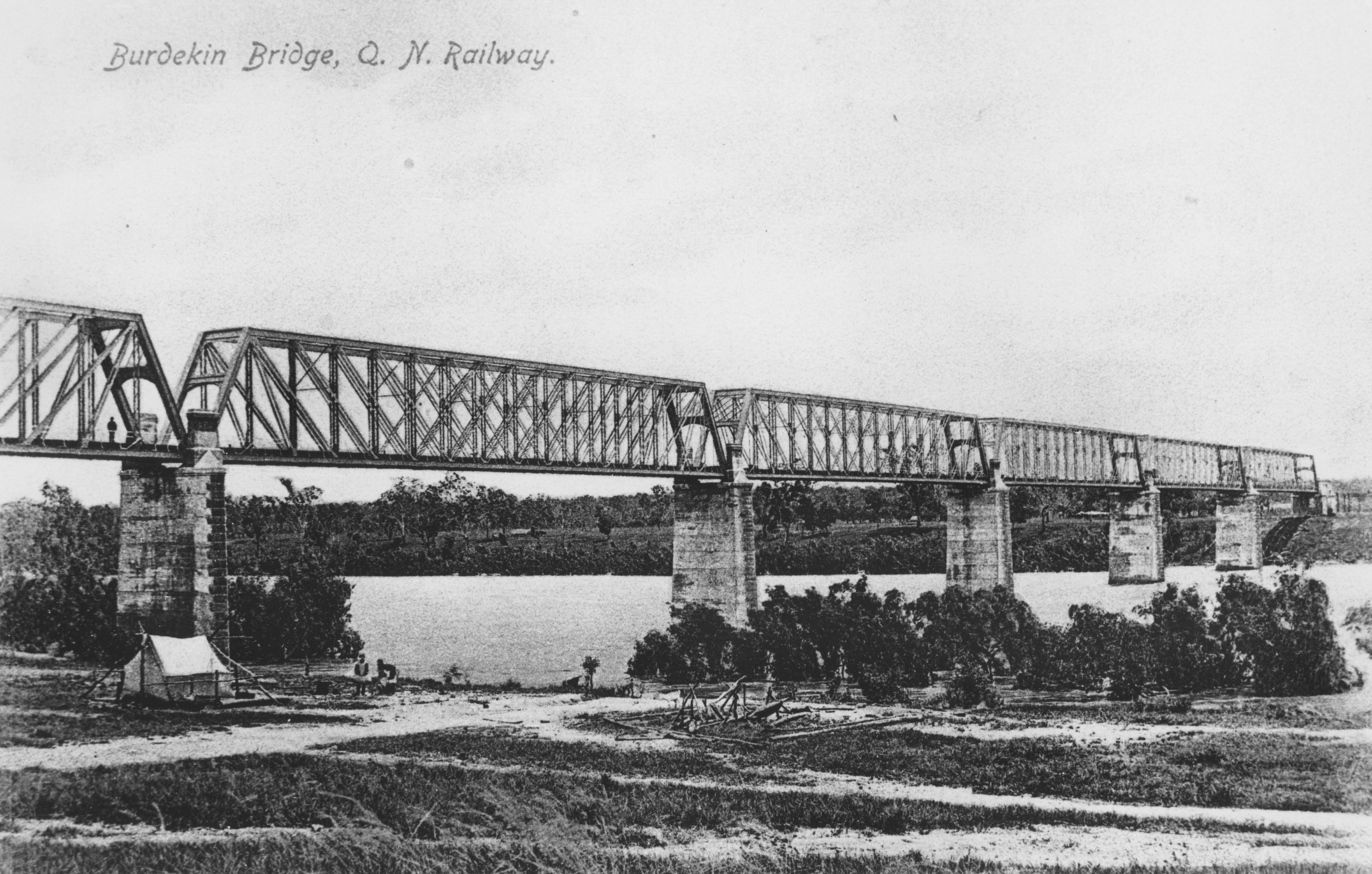
Burdekin River railway bridge, circa 1910

This bridge spans the Burdekin River at Macrossan and is no longer in use. It consists of six 250-foot (76 m) riveted-through Pratt truss spans flanked on either side by four 50-foot (15 m) plate girder spans supported on cast iron piers, concrete piers and one abutment.

It consists of the following components:

- 7 x 1 x 2 x 20-foot (6.1 m) timber longitudinals, decking, concrete abutments, common braced timber trestles
- 3 x 2 x 2 x 26-foot (7.9 m) timber longitudinals, decking, common braced timber trestles
- 6 x 2 x 2 x 36-foot (11 m) timber longitudinals with understrutting, decking, common braced timber trestles, common concrete pier
- 4 x 2 x 50-foot (15 m) rivetted half-through plate girders, decking, common concrete pier, common cast iron cylinder piers, common concrete arch
- 1 x 40-foot (12 m) concrete arch, decking
- 6 x 250-foot (76 m) riveted 14-panel double intersection through Pratt trusses, decking, common concrete arch, common concrete piers, common concrete arch
- 1 x 40-foot (12 m) arch span, decking
- 4 x 2 x 50-foot (15 m) rivetted half through plate girders, decking, common concrete arch, common cast iron cylinder piers, concrete abutment and embankment

== Heritage listing ==
The former Burdekin River Rail Bridge was listed on the Queensland Heritage Register on 21 October 1992 having satisfied the following criteria.

The place is important in demonstrating the evolution or pattern of Queensland's history.

This bridge, which allowed the railway to cross a major river, demonstrates the way in which Queensland was developed by linking important inland resources with ports.

The place is important in demonstrating the principal characteristics of a particular class of cultural places.

It is a good example of a metal truss bridge of its era and was the first of a number of this type built during this period, many of which have since been replaced.

The place is important in demonstrating a high degree of creative or technical achievement at a particular period.

It was one of the largest bridges in Queensland at the time of its construction and it demonstrates the skill with which the technology of the era was used to solve the problems of severe climatic conditions and terrain encountered by railway engineers.

The place has a special association with the life or work of a particular person, group or organisation of importance in Queensland's history.

It is an important example of the work of Henry Stanley, Chief Engineer for Railways and a major figure in the early history of engineering in Queensland.
