= Burdekin Falls Dam =

Dam in Queensland, Australia

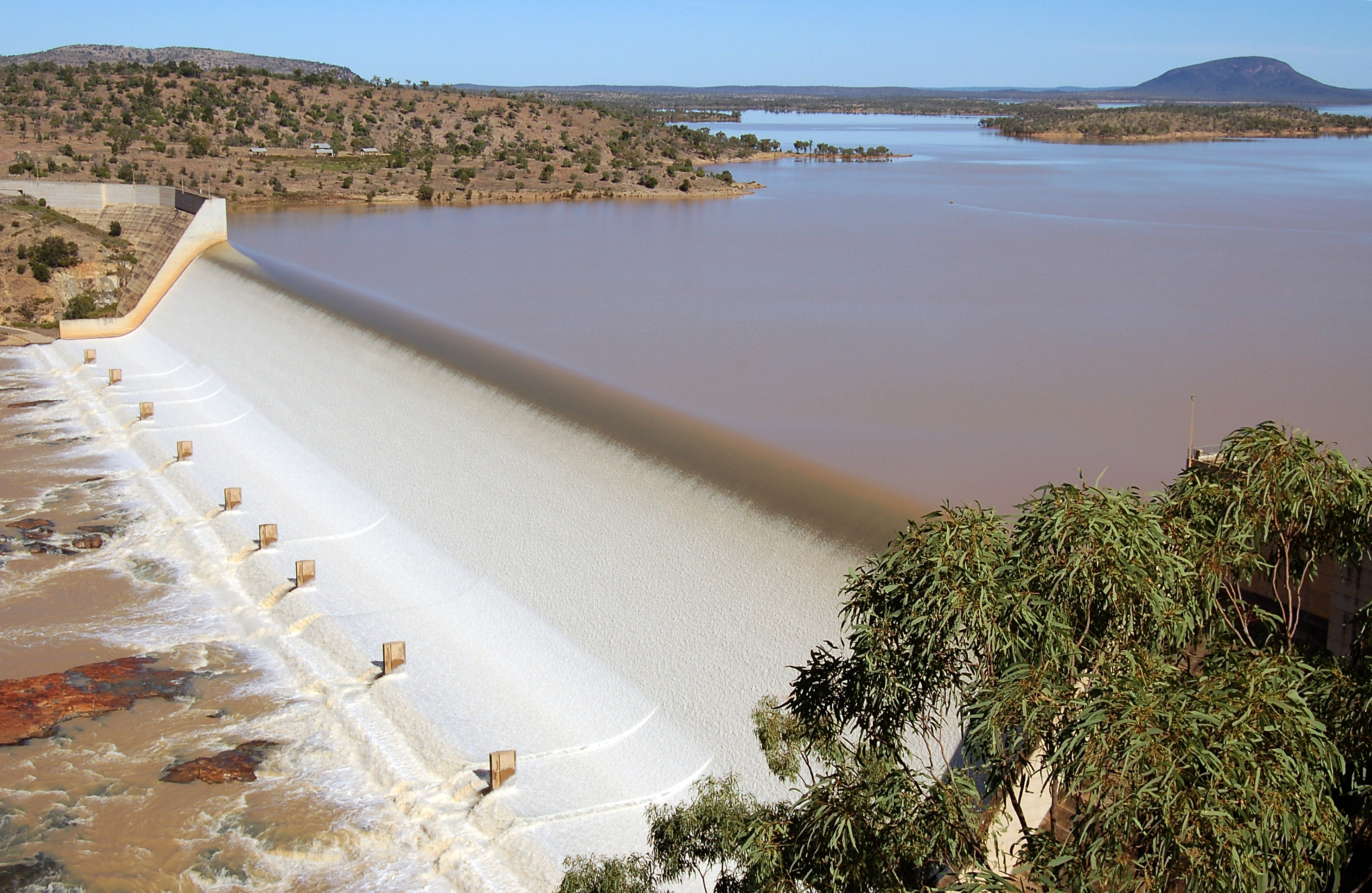
- Burdekin Falls Dam in 2009

- Location of the Burdekin Falls Dam wall in Queensland
- Country: Australia
- Location: Whitsunday Region
- Coordinates: 20.64389°S 148.13806°E
- Purpose: Irrigation
- Opening date: 1987
- Owner: SunWater

Dam and spillways
- Type of dam: Gravity dam
- Impounds: Burdekin River
- Height: 55 m (180 ft)
- Length: 876 m (2,874 ft)
- Dam volume: 1,860,000×10^{3} m^{3} (66,000×10^{6} cu ft)
- Spillways: 1
- Spillway type: Uncontrolled
- Spillway capacity: 64,600 m^{3}/s (2,280,000 cu ft/s)

Reservoir
- Creates: Lake Dalrymple
- Total capacity: 1,860,000 ML (410×10^{9} imp gal; 490×10^{9} US gal)
- Catchment area: 114,220 km^{2} (44,100 sq mi)
- Surface area: 22,400 ha (55,000 acres)
- Maximum water depth: 40 m (130 ft)
- Normal elevation: 154 m (505 ft)

The Burdekin Falls Dam, also known as the Burdekin Dam, is a concrete gravity dam with an uncontrolled spillway across the Burdekin River in the Whitsunday Region, Queensland, Australia. Built for the purpose of irrigation, the reservoir is called Lake Dalrymple, and is on the boundary of the Whitsunday Region and the Charters Towers Region. Burdekin Falls Dam is managed by SunWater. Water from the reservoir is also used to replenish downstream aquifers.

== Location and features ==
The dam wall is 876 metres (2,874 ft) long and has a 504-metre (1,654 ft) spillway, and a drop of 37 metres (121 ft). The reservoir holds 1,860,000 megalitres (410×10^{9} imp gal; 490×10^{9} US gal) at full capacity. The design allows for future storage capacity increases and potential for hydro-electricity generation. As of 2022, plans are in place to increase the safety of this dam in an extreme rainfall event by raising the spillway height by 2 metres (6 ft 7 in) increasing the storage capacity of the dam by 574,240 megalitres (20,279×10^{6} cu ft) or 31 per cent.

The catchment area for the dam extends north to the Seaview Range west of Ingham, south to the Drummond Range near Alpha through the Suttor and Belyando Rivers, southeast to the coastal ranges west of Mackay, and west beyond Charters Towers to the Lolworth, Montgomery and Stopem Blockem Ranges through the Clarke River.

== History ==
Construction of the dam began in 1984. It was completed by Leighton Contractors in 1987 and is the largest lake in the state, with a capacity four times that of Sydney Harbour. The lake filled after the wet season in 1988.

== Irrigation ==
The Burdekin River Irrigation Area was granted approval in 1980. It is Queensland's largest land and water conservation scheme. In 2007, the scheme was supplying 103,000 hectares (250,000 acres) of land located about 200 kilometres (120 mi) inland from Townsville with water to grow a range of crops including sugarcane, cotton and rice.

== Proposed hydroelectricity ==
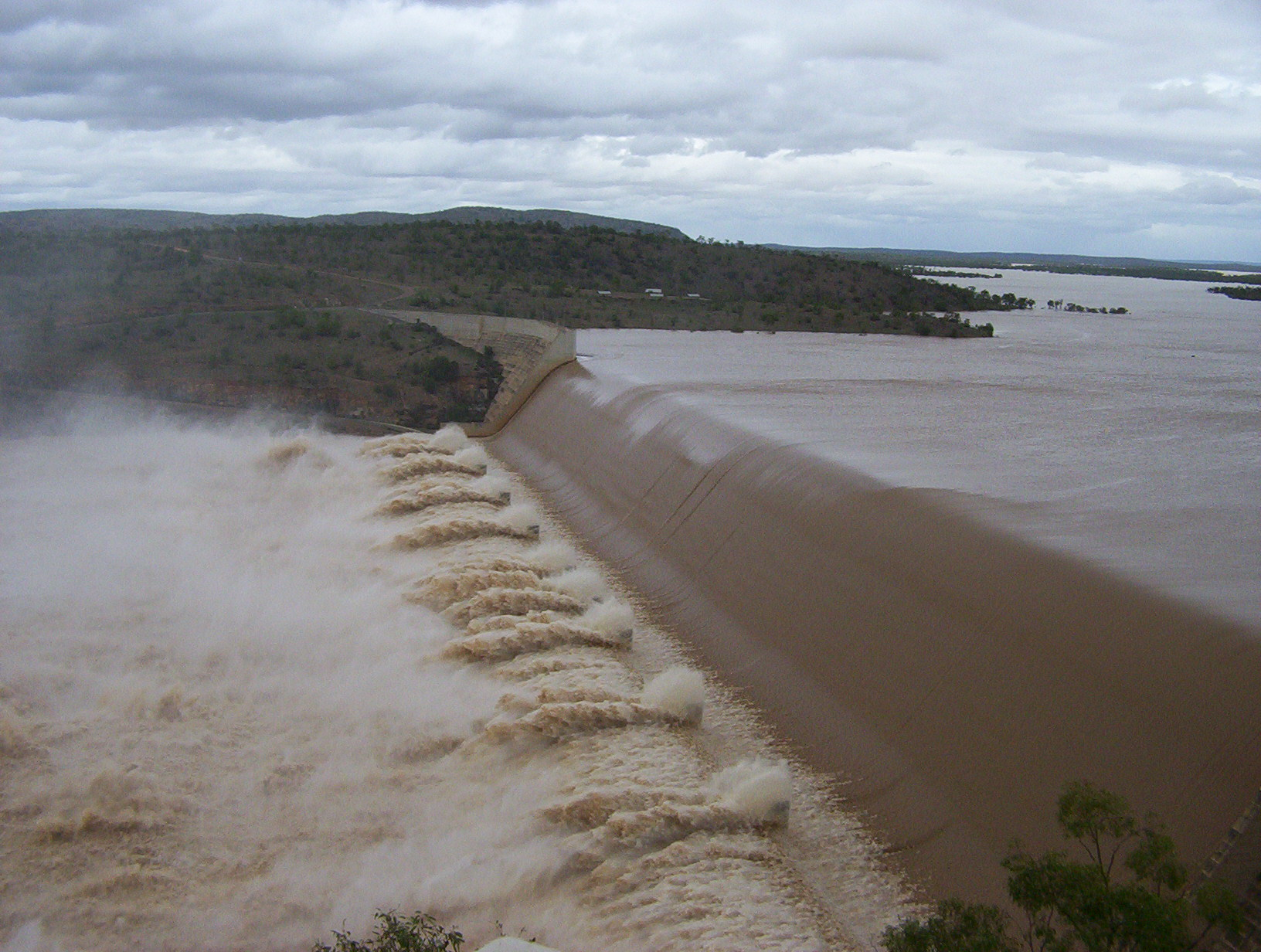
Water discharging at Burdekin Dam's spillway

In 2012, Stanwell Corporation undertook a feasibility study into a proposed 37 megawatts (50,000 hp) hydroelectric power station below the dam wall. It was proposed it would be capable of producing 125,000 megawatt-hours (450,000 GJ) annually, enough to power more than 9,500 homes each year. As at March 2025, construction of a 50 megawatts (67,000 hp) power plant is scheduled to commence in 2026 and is expected to begin operating in 2028.

== Boating ==
There are no boating restrictions, with a single boat ramp located near the dam wall. Water in the lake is often muddied with unsettled sediment long after the rains have washed it into the lake. This not only makes angling difficult but also means boating can be hazardous at high speeds due to the presence of submerged rocks.

== Fauna and flora ==
The lake has been stocked with sleepy cod, sooty grunter and barramundi. Numerous other species are present naturally, including forktail catfish, spangled perch, eel-tailed catfish, long tom, golden perch and archer fish. A "Stocked Impoundment Permit" is required to fish in the dam. Red-claw crayfish and freshwater crocodiles, although not native to this river, may also found in the lake. These were probably released by people who caught them from rivers of the Gulf of Carpentaria. Saltwater crocodiles are commonly known to take cattle from the reaches of both Burdekin and Suttor river sections of Lake Dalrymple reaches of the dam.

== Awards ==
In 2009 as part of the Q150 celebrations, the Burdekin Falls Dam was announced as one of the Q150 Icons of Queensland for its role as a "structure and engineering feat".

== See also ==
- List of dams and reservoirs in Queensland
