= Dalrymple, Queensland =

Dalrymple Queensland
- Coordinates: 19.8094°S 146.0947°E
- Established: 1864
- Postcode(s): 4820
- Location: 47.8 km (30 mi) NNW of Charters Towers; 183 km (114 mi) SW of Townsville; 1,355 km (842 mi) NNW of Brisbane
- LGA(s): Charters Towers Region

Dalrymple is a former township on the western bank of the Burdekin River, Charters Towers Region, Queensland, Australia. Established in 1864 as a police camp it was destroyed by flooding in 1870 and was abandoned in the following years. The site of the former township now falls within Dalrymple National Park where headstones and fencing remaining from the sites settlement can be found.

== History ==
In 1863, George Elphinstone Dalrymple claimed pastoral land in an area of recently opened crown lands, The Valley of Lagoons. A police camp was established at the southern extent of Dalrymple's land, the future location of the township, and in 1864 became the first inland town in Northern Australia to be surveyed. The township became a crossing of the Burdekin River for travellers headed west from Townsville and following the discovery of Gold at Cape River in 1868 became a major center for the nearby goldfields.

In 1868 the township was formally named Dalrymple after the man. At its peak the township had 5 hotels and many other businesses. The township was destroyed in 1870 by floods, was in the years that followed abandoned due to the exhaustion of the nearby Cape River goldfields in 1869 and the discovery of gold in nearby Ravenswood and Charters Towers. The population had fallen to 59 by 1881 and was just 25 in 1886. By 1901 the site of the former township was entirely abandoned and few structures remained.

Burdekin Post Office opened on 1 April 1864, was renamed Dalrymple by 1868 and closed in 1887.
