= Basalt River =

Basalt
- Location of Basalt River mouth in Queensland

Location
- Country: Australia
- State: Queensland
- Region: North Queensland

Physical characteristics
- Source: Great Dividing Range
  - location: below Kings Knob
  - coordinates: 19°56′35″S 144°47′41″E
  - elevation: 750 m (2,460 ft)
- Mouth: confluence with the Burdekin River
  - location: north of Charters Towers
  - coordinates: 19°37′51″S 145°52′44″E
  - elevation: 277 m (909 ft)
- Length: 179 km (111 mi)
- Basin size: 2,900 km^{2} (1,100 sq mi)

Basin features
- River system: Burdekin River
- Tributaries
  - left: Harry Creek, Wyandotte Creek, Little Limestone Creek, Gorge Creek, Sandy Creek (Queensland), Stockyard Creek (Queensland)
  - right: Ezzy Creek, Jacko Creek

The Basalt River is a river in North Queensland, Australia. The river rises on the eastern slopes of the Great Dividing Range and flows generally east into the Burdekin River about 60 kilometres (37 mi) north of Charters Towers. The river has a length of 179 kilometres (111 mi) and a catchment size of 2,900 square kilometres (1,100 sq mi).

The river catchment is mostly used for livestock grazing. The river contains a number of large, permanent, deep and clear waterholes.

== See also ==
- List of rivers of Australia § Queensland
