= Burdekin River =

River in Queensland, Australia

Burdekin
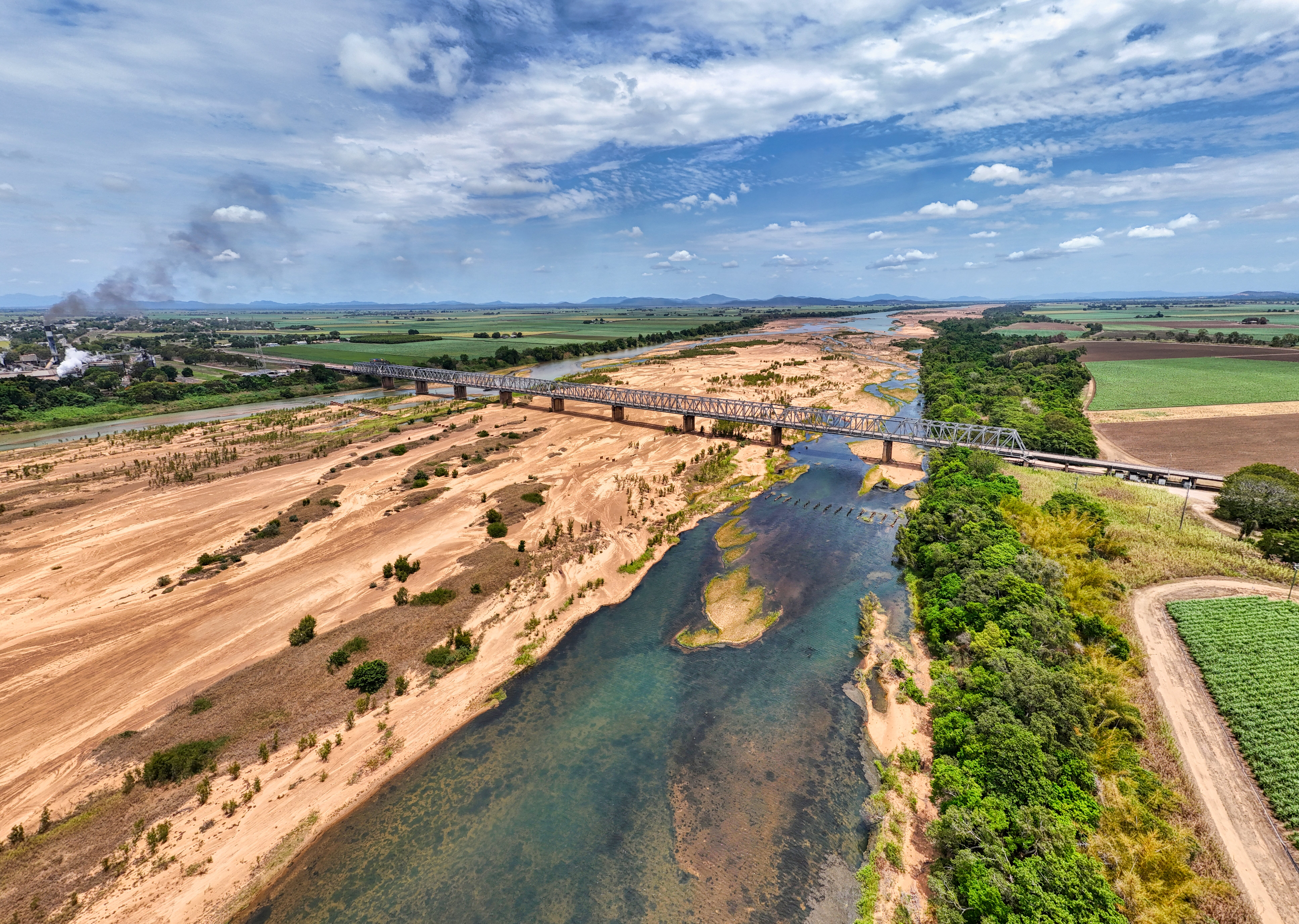
- The Burdekin River and the Burdekin Bridge, 2024

- Location of Burdekin River mouth in Queensland
- Etymology: Thomas Burdekin

Location
- Country: Australia
- State: Queensland
- Region: North Queensland, Far North Queensland
- Settlements: Charters Towers, Home Hill

Physical characteristics
- Source: Seaview Range
  - location: near Ingham
  - coordinates: 18°42′12″S 145°44′23″E
  - elevation: 620 m (2,030 ft)
- Mouth: Coral Sea
  - location: Upstart Bay
  - coordinates: 19°38′49″S 147°29′14″E
  - elevation: 0 m (0 ft)
- Length: 886 km (551 mi)
- Basin size: 129,700 km^{2} (50,100 sq mi)
- Discharge
  - average: 380 m^{3}/s (13,000 cu ft/s)
  - minimum: 0 m^{3}/s (0 cu ft/s)
  - maximum: 40,000 m^{3}/s (1,400,000 cu ft/s)

Basin features
- Tributaries
  - left: Running River, Fanning River, Kirk River
  - right: Dry River (Queensland), Clarke River (Queensland), Basalt River, Broughton River (Queensland), Cape River (Queensland), Suttor River, Bowen River (Queensland), Bogie River
- Reservoir and lakes: Lake Dalrymple; Lamonds Lagoon

The Burdekin River is a river in North and Far North Queensland, Australia. The river rises on the northern slopes of Boulder Mountain at Valley of Lagoons, part of the western slope of the Seaview Range, and flows into the Coral Sea at Upstart Bay over 200 kilometres (124 mi) to the southeast of the source, with a catchment area of approximately 130,000 square kilometres (50,000 sq mi). The Burdekin River is Australia's largest river by peak discharge volume, but not average discharge.

The river was first encountered by Europeans during the expedition led by Ludwig Leichhardt in 1845 and named in honour of Thomas Burdekin, one of the sponsors of the expedition.

== Course and features ==
The Burdekin River rises on the western slopes of the Seaview Range, part of the Great Dividing Range, west of Ingham. In the river's upper catchment, from its source the river generally flows west and then south out of the Girringun National Park, part of the UNESCO Wet Tropics World Heritage Area. This area, now part of Basalt was the location of one of the earliest inland settlements in northern Australia and was known as Dalrymple. The river is joined by Lucy Creek, the Running River, Star River and Keelbottom Creek, above Charters Towers. From the west in the Dry Tropics to the west of the river, the river is joined by the Clarke, Basalt and Dry rivers. South of Charters Towers, the upper catchment of the Burdekin River is joined by the Fanning River, and then continues to flow south through wetlands before entering Lake Dalrymple, the reservoir created by the Burdekin Falls Dam.

Within Lake Dalrymple, the Burdekin River is joined by the Cape, Suttor/Belyando rivers. The source of the Belyando River in central western Queensland is almost 500 kilometres (311 mi) from the mouth of the Burdekin River, and extends into the typical black-soil grassland of Central Queensland, with the Belyando draining the Drummond and Galilee Basins and flowing north for over 1,000 kilometres (620 mi).

Below the dam wall, in the river's lower catchment, is northern Australia's largest irrigation area with approximately 80,000 hectares (200,000 acres) under irrigation, predominantly for growing sugarcane. It consists of two broad regions, the earlier established delta region located on the coarse sedimentary deposits of the Burdekin River Delta, a groundwater dominated scheme, and the Burdekin Haughton Water Supply Scheme (BHWSS) – a more recently developed surface water dominated scheme on alluvial floodplains of the Burdekin River. Here the Burdekin is joined by the Bowen and Bogie rivers.

The Burdekin River descends 620 metres (2,030 ft) over its 886-kilometre (551 mi) course.

Four DIWA wetlands can be found along the course of the river. The first is at the Valley of Lagoons in the upper region of the catchment, the next is at Lake Dalrymple, then at the junction of the Burdekin and Bowen rivers known as the Burdekin-Bowen Junction and Blue Valley Weir Aggregation and the last is at the river delta which forms a 342.5 square kilometres (132 sq mi) wetland.

The Burdekin River is one of the most economically important rivers in Australia, and has the fourth-largest watershed of any exorheic drainage system in Australia. It is also the fourth-largest river in Australia by volume of flow, but is so erratic that its discharge can reach the mean discharge of the Yangtze River (after two severe cyclones in 1958) or have as many as seven months with no flow whatsoever (as in 1923). This exceedingly erratic flow is due to the extreme variability of precipitation throughout the entire basin. Annual rainfall at most gauges within the basin can range from 200 to 1,600 millimetres (7.9 to 63.0 in) depending on the monsoon and the number of cyclones that cross the coast. On the coast itself, the variability is even higher: at Bowen not far from the river's mouth, the annual rainfall has ranged from 216 millimetres (9 in) in 1915 to over 2,200 millimetres (87 in) in 1950. It has the highest mean annual flow for any river adjacent to the Great Barrier Reef.

== History ==
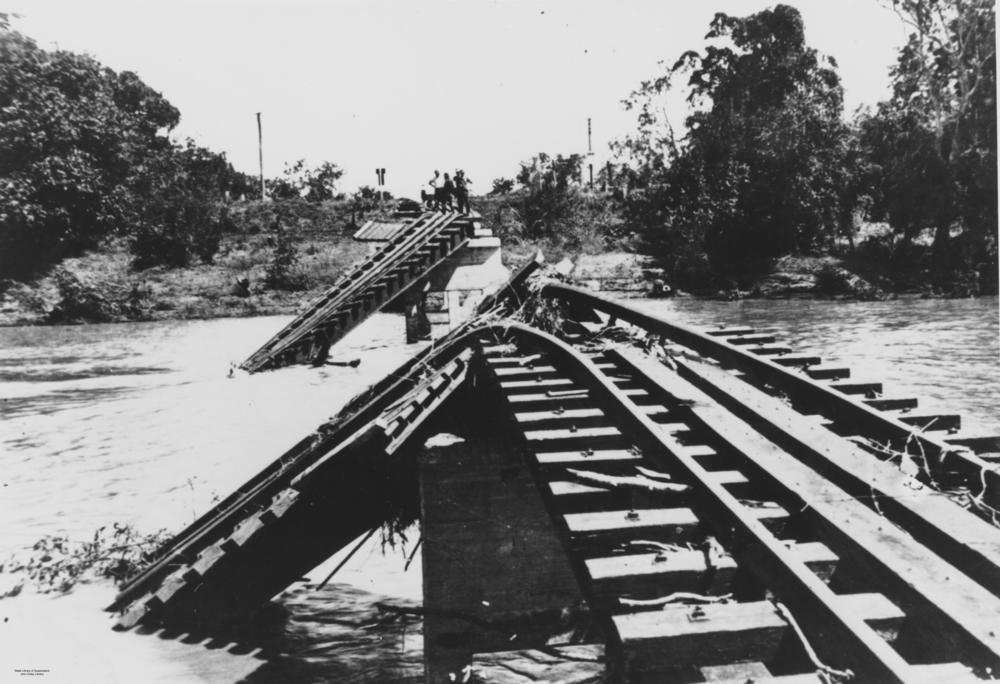
Flood damaged railway bridge over the Burdekin River, 1917

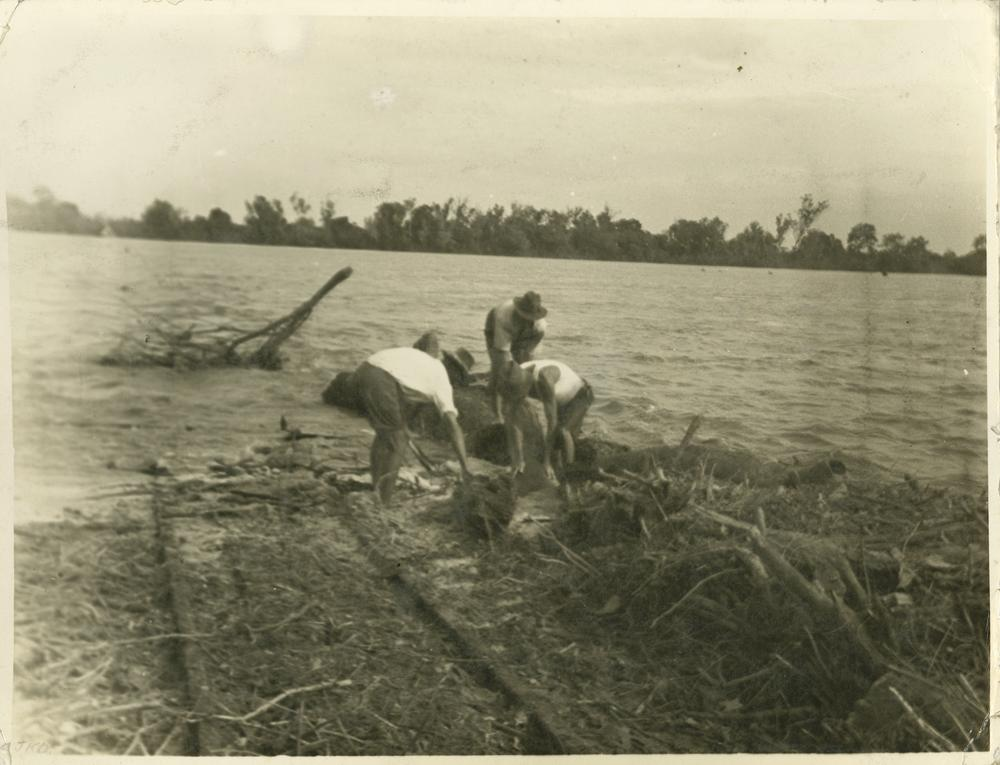
Burdekin River in flood in Ayr

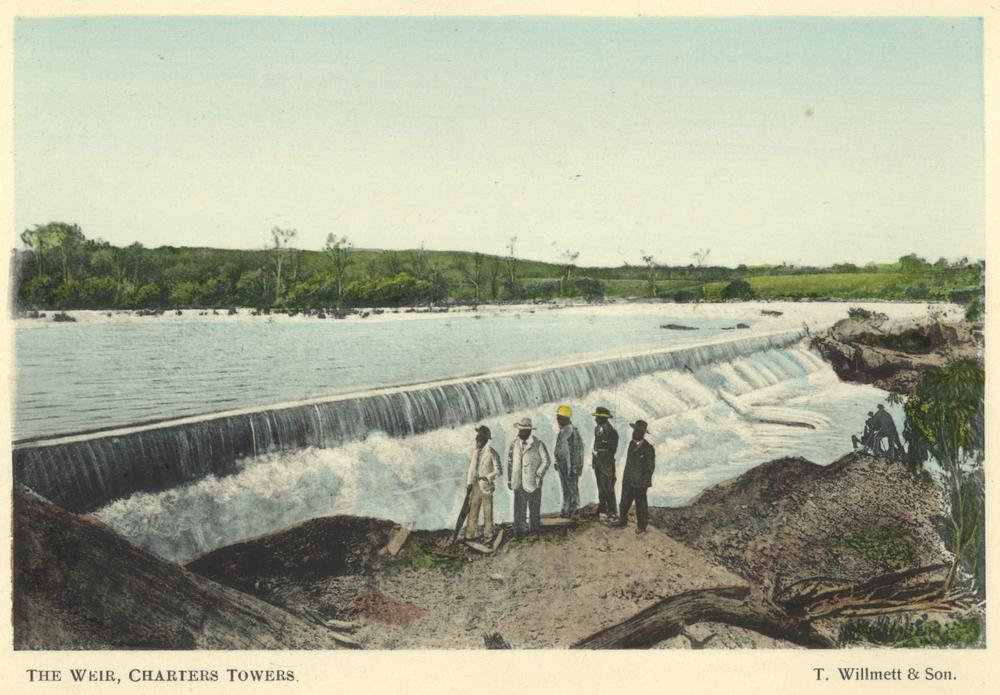
Charters Towers weir, 1904

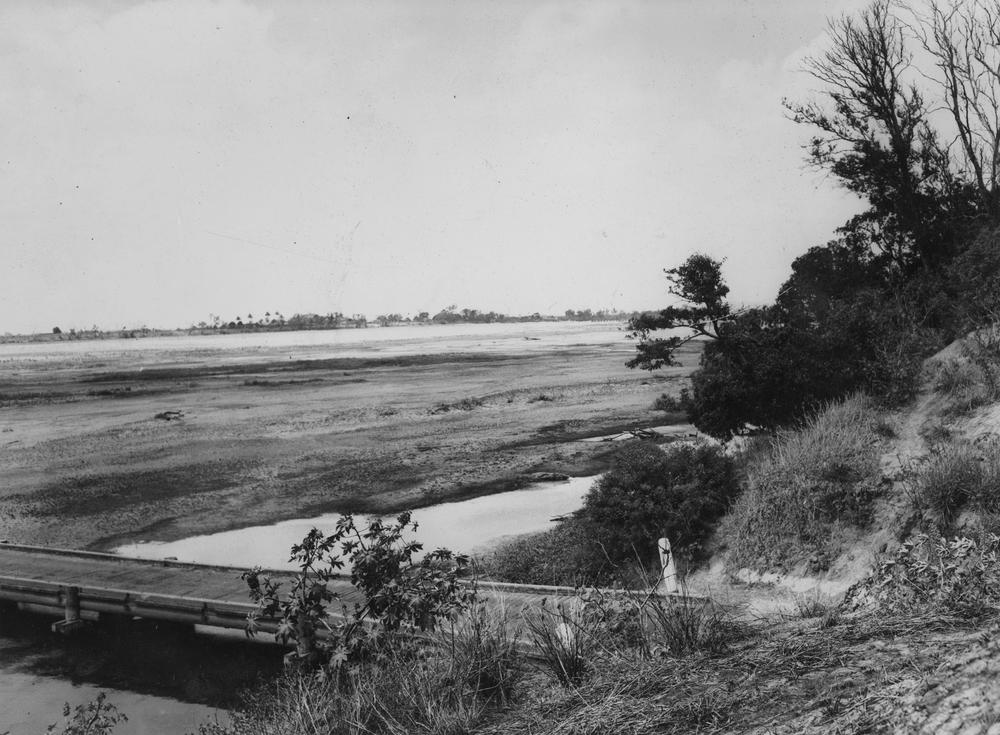
Burdekin River at its lowest level, 1948

Gugu Badhun (also known as Koko-Badun and Kokopatun) is an Australian Aboriginal language of North Queensland. The language region includes areas within the local government area of Charters Towers Region, particularly the localities of Greenvale and the Valley of Lagoons, and in the Upper Burdekin River area and in Abergowrie.

Yuru (also known as Juru, Euronbba, Juru, Mal Mal, Malmal) is an Australian Aboriginal language spoken on Yuru country. The Yuru language region includes the landscape within the local government boundaries of the Shire of Burdekin, including the town of Home Hill.

The river was first discovered by Europeans by John Clements Wickham aboard HMS Beagle in 1839 who named it the Wickham River. In 1849, Ludwig Leichhardt named the river after Thomas Burdekin, one of the sponsors of Leichhardt's expedition. Because he was inland away from the coast he was not aware it was the same watercourse named by Wickham. The town of Wickham was established on Rita Island at the river mouth but was soon swept away during a flood in the 1860s.

Pastoralists had established runs along the river during the 1860s, with some along the lower reached taken for selection in the 1880s.

In 1899, the Burdekin River Rail Bridge was built over the river about 24 km NE of Charters Towers to carry the Great Northern railway. Although replaced by a new bridge in 1964, the old bridge remains and is listed on the Queensland Heritage Register.

The townships of Ayr and Brandon were established in 1882 with many sugarmills being erected. The North Coast railway between Ayr and Townsville had the Inkerman Bridge over the Burdekin River from McDesme to Home Hill which was built in 1913 followed by bridge for road traffic in 1930. Both were too low and often damaged during flooding and the decision was made to replace them with a higher dual level bridge known as the Silver Link. Construction commenced in 1947 and was not completed until 1957 when the bridge opened.

A weir was constructed in a gorge in the Leichhardt Range for settlement farms near Clare and Dalbeg in 1953 for growing tobacco. In 1984 construction of the Burdekin Falls Dam commenced and was completed by 1987 when the dam started to fill forming Lake Dalrymple.

=== Floods ===
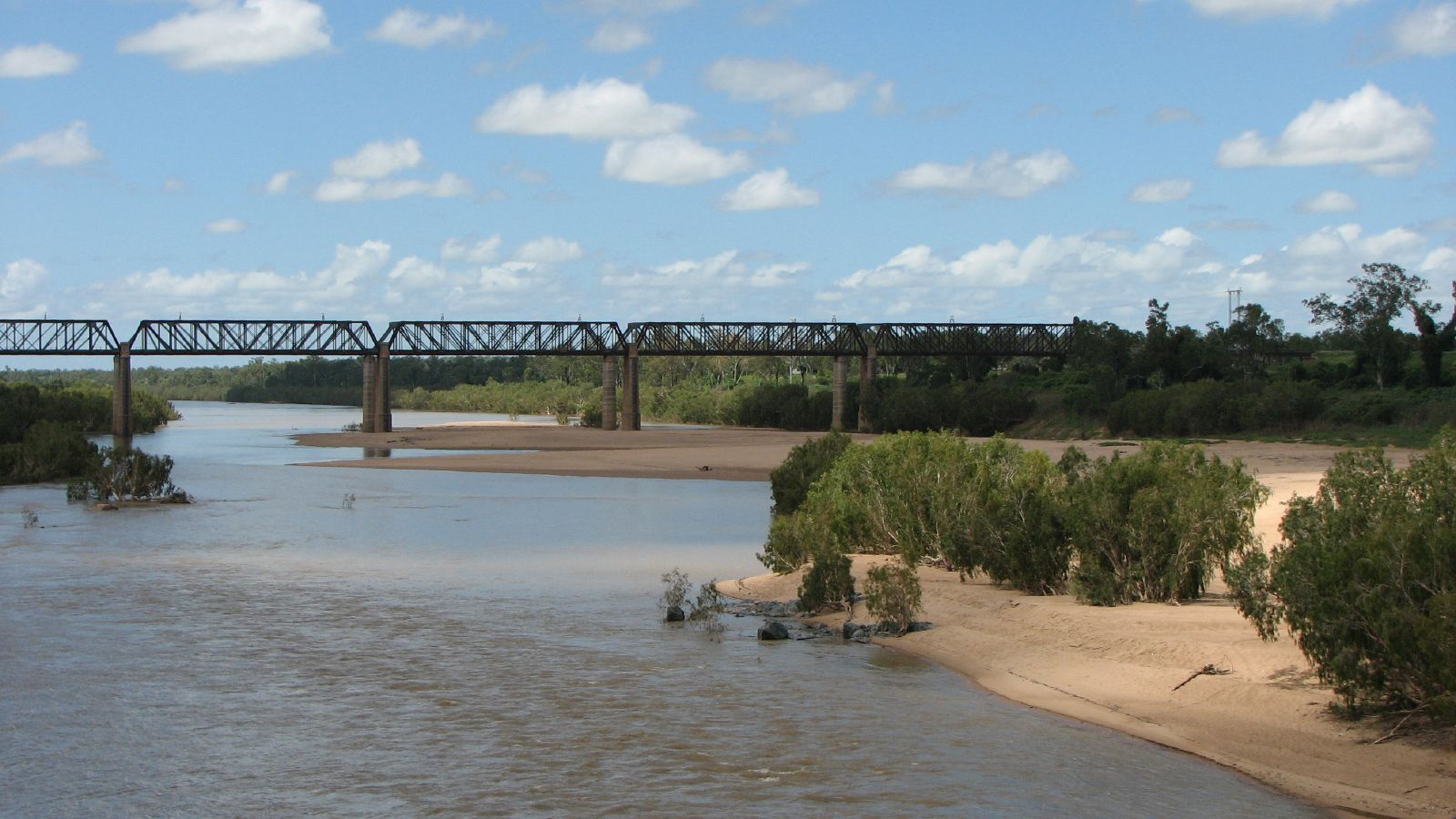
Burdekin River Flows near Charters Towers

Floods events occur on average from no floods to three per year between December and March.

Heavy flooding occurred in 1875 with the Dawson, Fitzroy, Mary and Burdekin Rivers rising up to 60 feet (18 m) in a few hours. The waters washed away dwellings, fencing and livestock and effects downstream included the loss of the steamer SS Gothenburg which was unable to steer effectively and ran aground on a reef at the entrance of Flinders Channel.

In 1917 more severe flooding occurred with the bridge at Inkerman under 11 feet (3 m) of water and the one at Ayr over 14 feet (4 m) underwater after a day of flooding. Approximately one third of the Inkerman Bridge was later washed away by the floodwaters.

Further flooding occurred in 1927 with waters running nearly 6 feet (2 m) over the Inkerman Bridge and 3 feet (1 m) over the Burdekin Bridge, the river reached its peak at 66 feet (20 m) above summer levels at Sellheim.

During the 1974 flood event associated with Cyclone Wanda, which lasted from 17 December 1973 to 23 April 1974, an estimated mass discharge peak of 25,000 tonnes (25,000 long tons; 28,000 short tons) of water per second was reached, which affected 450 kilometres (280 mi) of coastline and created a plume with widths ranging from 25 to 100 kilometres (16 to 62 mi).

== Water storage ==
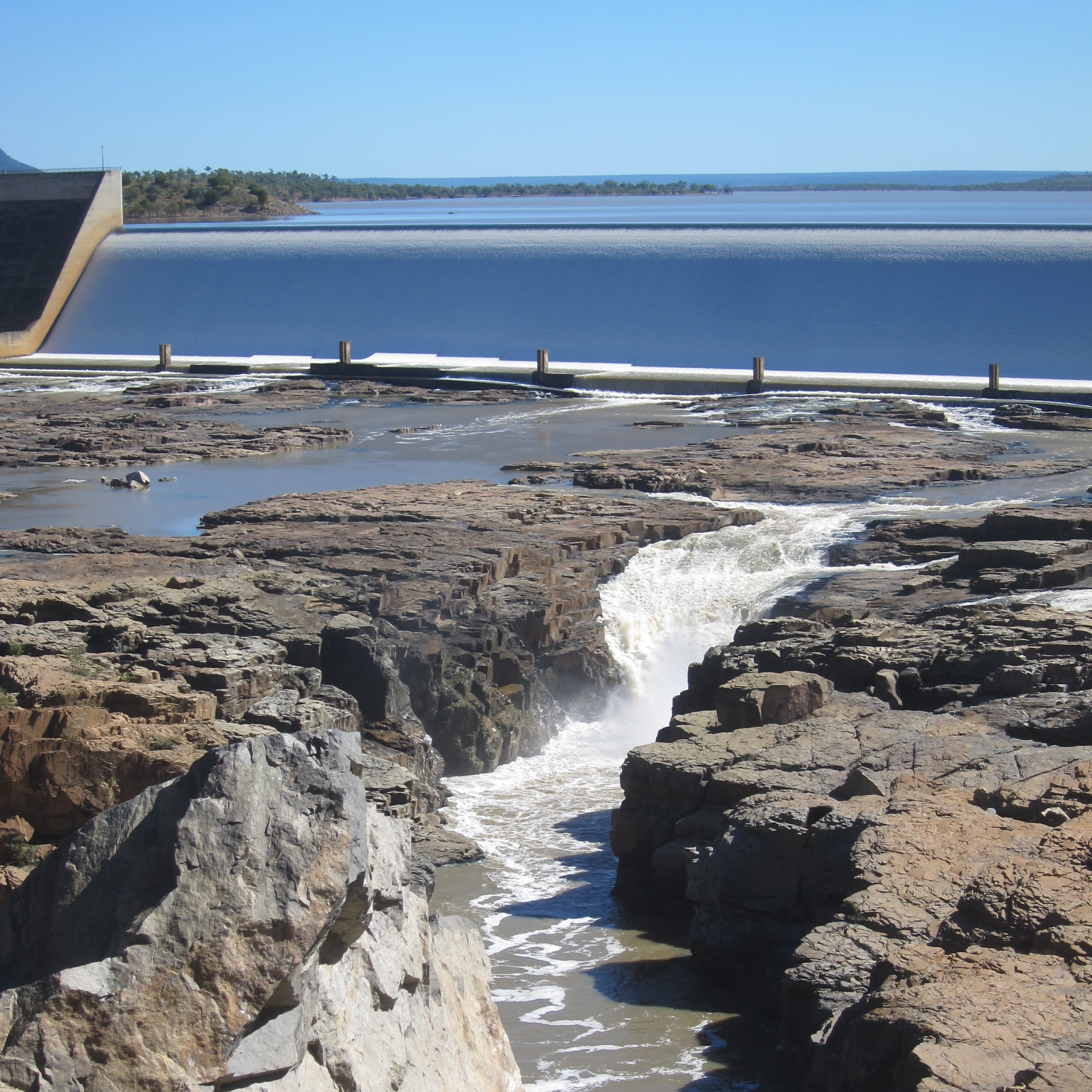

The Burdekin Falls Dam, the largest dam in Queensland was constructed west of Ayr and Home Hill and completed in 1987 to form what is also known as Lake Dalrymple.

As part of the proposed Bradfield Scheme the upper Burdekin River was to be used to feed water by gravity westwards to the upper reaches of the Flinders River.

=== Irrigation ===
On the lower Burdekin floodplain an irrigation area was established in the early 1950s. At first only Gorge Weir and Blue Valley Weir provided water to the scheme, until the 1970s when Eungella Dam also provided water. Water is also drawn from the Haughton River. Major pump stations are located at Clare Weir feeding water to both sides of the river. An area of 2,560 square kilometres (990 sq mi) is irrigated.

In the delta around Ayr and Home Hill, groundwater is used extensively to irrigate crops of sugar cane. This groundwater is recharged artificially during the extreme flood events that occasionally occur, usually due to a La Niña event. The use of groundwater in the floodplain is carefully managed so that supply can be maintained during the dry season and to prevent saltwater intrusion.

== Watershed ==
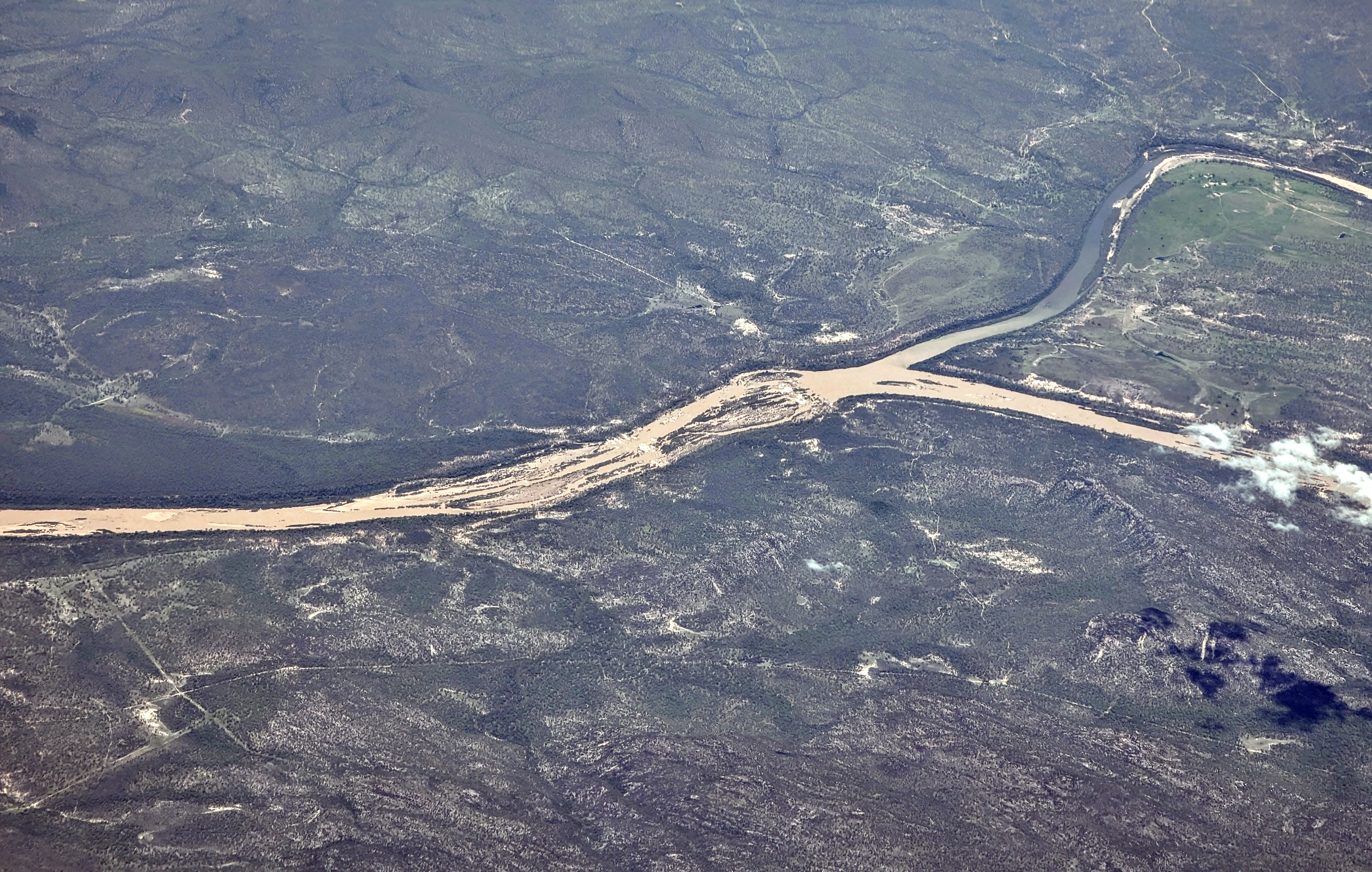
Aerial view of the confluence of the Bowen River (upper) with the Burdekin River

The North Coast railway line crosses the river at Home Hill, via a bridge constructed in 1913. At the same location the Bruce Highway traverses the river via the Burdekin Bridge. Further west, the river is crossed by the Flinders Highway.

Although on paper most of the basin of the Burdekin appears perfect for rainfed crops like cotton and maize, in fact the rainfall is so erratic that in almost every year a would-be farmer will experience either too little or too much rain for the crop to mature properly. Thus, most of the basin of the Burdekin can be used only for low-density grazing of sheep and cattle, since grazing is less likely to be damaged economically and ecologically by the extreme risks of an extraordinarily erratic climate.

The Valley of Lagoons Station was established in 1862 after the area in the upper reaches of the Burdekin was opened up by the government. Initially stocked with sheep, the property was later used to raise cattle. In 1864, Inkerman Station was established toward the lower reaches, where the town of Inkerman now stands. The area was plagued by cattle tick, so the government acquired the property in 1910 and sold it off as farmland where sugarcane was later grown.

The natural vegetation away from the coast is a grassland dominated by perennial Mitchell and annual Flinders grasses. Near the coast there are patches of dry eucalypt forest on the typically infertile laterised soils characteristic of most of Australia.

Few mines exist along the waterway, with the notable exception of the Ben Lomond Uranium mine which is situated approximately 50 kilometres (31 mi) west of Townsville. The mine is currently dormant, but in 1981 the mine discharged toxic waste containing unacceptable levels of radioactivity, when its tailing dam overflowed into a creek that feeds into the Burdekin.

== Wildlife ==
Neosilurus mollespiculum is a species of eeltail catfish endemic to the Burdekin. Many other species such as Agassiz's glassfish, Irwin's turtle, banded grunter, barramundi, black catfish, eastern rainbowfish, empire gudgeon, freshwater longtom, mangrove jack, tilapia and yellowbelly are found throughout the catchment.

== See also ==
- Burdekin Gap
- List of rivers of Australia § Queensland
